Women in music include women as composers, songwriters, instrumental performers, singers, conductors, music scholars, music educators, music critics/music journalists, and in other musical professions. Also, it describes music movements (e.g., women's music, which is music written and performed by women for women), events and genres related to women, women's issues, and feminism.

In the 2010s, while women constitute a significant proportion of popular music and classical music singers, and a significant proportion of songwriters (many of them being singer-songwriters), there are few women record producers, rock critics and rock instrumentalists. Women artists in pop music, such as Björk, Lady Gaga and Madonna, have commented about sexism in the music industry. Additionally, a recent study led by Dr. Smith announced that "...over the last six years, the representation of women in the music industry has been even lower". In classical music, although there have been a huge number of women composers from the Medieval period to the present day, women composers are significantly underrepresented in the commonly performed classical music repertoire, music history textbooks and music encyclopedias; for example, in the Concise Oxford History of Music, Clara Schumann is one of the only female composers who is mentioned.

Women constitute a significant proportion of instrumental soloists in classical music and the percentage of women in orchestras is increasing. A 2015 article on concerto soloists in major Canadian orchestras, however, indicated that 84% of the soloists with the Orchestre Symphonique de Montreal were men. In 2012, women still made up just 6% of the top-ranked Vienna Philharmonic orchestra. Women are less common as instrumental players in popular music genres such as rock and heavy metal, although there have been various female instrumentalists and all-female bands. Women are particularly underrepresented in extreme metal genres. Women are also underrepresented in orchestral conducting, music criticism/music journalism, music producing, and sound engineering. While women were discouraged from composing in the 19th century, and there are few women musicologists, women became involved in music education "to such a degree that women dominated [this field] during the later half of the 19th century and well into the 20th century."

According to Jessica Duchen, a music writer for London's The Independent, women musicians in classical music are "too often judged for their appearances, rather than their talent" and they face pressure "to look sexy onstage and in photos." Duchen states that while "[t]here are women musicians who refuse to play on their looks...the ones who do tend to be more materially successful." According to the UK's Radio 3 editor, Edwina Wolstencroft, the music industry has long been open to having women in performance or entertainment roles, but women are much less likely to have positions of authority, such as being the conductor of an orchestra, a profession which has been called "one of the last glass ceilings in the music industry". In popular music, while there are many women singers recording songs, there are very few women behind the audio console acting as music producers, the individuals who direct and manage the recording process. One of the most recorded artists is a woman, Asha Bhosle, an Indian singer who is best known as a playback singer in Hindi cinema.

Songwriters

A songwriter is an individual who writes the lyrics, melodies and chord progressions for songs, typically for a popular music genre such as pop, rock or country music. A songwriter can also be called a composer, although the latter term tends to be mainly used for individuals from the classical music genre.

A cowriter can help a songwriter balance out their own strengths and shortcomings by specializing in a particular area, such as lyrics or arranging. Many of the Top 40 songs that we continuously hear on Spotify or Pandora are written by seasoned songwriters who then hand over their tune to top-tier talent for recording. Not all songwriters are singers.

Even if the writers of long-forgotten children's songs have been lost to time, every jingle you hear and tune you remember as a child has an original composer. Opera, liturgical music, and musicals all fit this description. Anytime a lyric is put to a melody, you can bet that a songwriter played a key role.

A musician who writes lyrics for songs or professionally composes musical compositions is known as a songwriter. Although this term is typically only used in the context of classical music and cinema scoring, the person who writes the music for a song might be referred to as a composer. A lyricist is a songwriter who primarily creates the lyrics for a song. Songwriting is frequently a task that is divided among several persons because to the demand from the music industry to create successful tunes.

19th century-early 20th century
"Only a few of the many women [songwriters] in America had their music published and heard during the late 19th and early 20th centuries." According to Richard A. Reublin and Richard G. Beil, the "lack of mention of women [songwriters] is a glaring and embarrassing omission in our musical heritage." Women "struggled to write and publish music in the man's world of 20th century Tin Pan Alley. Prior to 1900 and even after, it was expected that "women would perform music, not make music." In 1880, Chicago music critic George P. Upton wrote the book Women in Music, in which he argued that "women lacked the innate creativity to compose good music" due to the "biological predisposition" of women. Later, it was accepted that women would have a role in music education, and they became involved in this field "to such a degree that women dominated music education during the later half of the 19th century and well into the 20th century." As part of women's role in music education, women wrote hymns and children's music. The "secular music in print in America before 1825 shows only about 70 works by women." In the mid 19th century, women songwriters emerged, including Faustina Hasse Hodges, Susan Parkhurst, Augusta Browne and Marion Dix Sullivan. By 1900, there were many more women songwriters, but "many were still forced to use pseudonyms or initials" to hide the fact that they were women.

Carrie Jacobs-Bond was the "preeminent woman composer of the late 1800s and well into the middle of the twentieth century... [making her] the first million selling woman" songwriter. Maude Nugent (1877–1958) wrote "Sweet Rosie O'Grady" in 1896. She also penned "Down at Rosie Reilly's Flat", "My Irish Daisy" and "Mary From Tipperary". Charlotte Blake (1885–1979) was a staff writer for at the Whitney Warner Publishing Co., in Detroit, Michigan. Initially, the company billed her as "C. Blake" to hide her gender, but by 1906 ads used her full name. Caro Roma (1866–1937) was the gender-ambiguous pseudonym for Carrie Northly. She was "one of America's more well known and popular composers of the Tin Pan Alley era." Her songs include "Can't Yo' Heah Me Calling", "Faded Rose", "The Angelus", "Thinking of Thee" and "Resignation". About 95% of the songwriters in British music hall during the early 1900s were men; however, about 30% of the singers were women.

Jazz in the 20th century

While jazz songwriting has long been a male-dominated field, there have also been women jazz songwriters. In the 1930s, Ann Ronell (1905–1993) wrote the songs "Willow Weep for Me" and "Who's Afraid of the Big Bad Wolf?". Irene Higginbotham (1918–1988) wrote almost 50 songs, her best-known being "Good Morning Heartache". Dorothy Fields (1905–1974) wrote the lyrics for over 400 songs, some of which were played by Duke Ellington. She co-wrote "The Way You Look Tonight" with Jerome Kern, which won the 1936 Oscar for Best Song. She co-wrote several jazz standards with Jimmy McHugh, such as "Exactly Like You", "On the Sunny Side of the Street" and "I Can't Give You Anything but Love". Lil Hardin Armstrong (1898–1971) played piano in King Oliver's Creole Jazz Band. Her song "Struttin' with Some Barbecue" has been recorded 500 times. Armstrong also recorded "Doin' the Suzie Q", "Just for a Thrill" and "Bad Boy". Billie Holiday (1915–1959) was a singer who co-wrote "God Bless the Child" and "Don't Explain" with Arthur Herzog, Jr. and she penned the blues song "Fine and Mellow".

Jazz music was a propelling force to help women with liberation in the early 20th century. Jazz music also helped pave the way for more jobs for women. This increase of a very male-dominated career until the 1920s allowed more women to be in a performing arts career. In return of this increase, Showboat, the first jazz Broadway musical, was produced. Showboat discusses the hardships of family in Mississippi and the reunification of family. Jazz music influenced in helping women gain more jobs, open environment for post-war equality, and open sexuality in the early twentieth century. Many of the women in jazz music at the time helped influence the genre and many jazz women musicians were people of color. These factors helped grow the jazz music genre to what it is today.

Many women influenced jazz music by producing, composing and performing jazz music. A woman who was influential in jazz music was Bessie Smith, also known as the Empress of the Blues. She lived from 1894 to 1937. She is a rock and roll hall of fame inductee, and 1989 Smith was awarded a Grammy Lifetime Achievement Award. Another woman who made history in the jazz industry is Dolly Jones. She was the first woman jazz trumpeter to be recorded. Many women do not get credit in this genre as do their male counterparts. Women like Sweet Emma Barrett, who performed in the Original Tuxedo Orchestra toured domestically and internationally. One of Barrett's hit songs is "A Good Man is Hard to Find". More women such as Billie Pierce, Lovie Austin,  Jeanette Kimball, Mary Lou Williams, Alice Coltrane, and Hazel Scott, all had an impact in the jazz genre. These women made their mark especially by being women in a very male-dominated genre.

Many of these women who are well known in the jazz world are not seen to receive as much recognition as they deserve because of their male competitors. Not only were women influential as jazz singers, but there are so many jazz musicians that also do not get their credit. One woman was Ingrid Monson, who brought to the attention that when women first started to play the piano, they also gained more social acceptance in the music industry. Typically women would be seen to play in an all-women's jazz group, but when they would step into the "professional jazz world" they would be an instant hit. One woman, by the name of Valaida Snow was also known as the "queen of the trumpet". Another woman, Nona Gendryx, was a jazz vocalist who also played many instruments and got the chance to work with many talented Hip Hop artists like Prince. There are many such accomplished women whose names we do not know..

These women had a lot of success, but for some it was short lived. These women rose to fame when men were drafted off into World War II. However, once these men came home from being deployed, the jazz musicians who were women were then faced with difficult hardships. Problems such as sexual harassment and harsh criticism from their other band members and fellow jazz musicians were seen.

Pop in the 1960s
In the 1960s pop music scene, "[l]ike most aspects of the...music business [in the 1960s], songwriting was a male-dominated field. Though there were plenty of female singers on the radio, women ...were primarily seen as consumers:... Singing was sometimes an acceptable pastime for a girl, but playing an instrument, writing songs, or producing records simply wasn't done." Young women "were not socialized to see themselves as people who create [music]." Carole King "had a successful songwriting partnershi[p] with husband Gerry Goffin, penning hits like "The Loco-Motion," "Will You Love Me Tomorrow", "Up on the Roof" and "Natural Woman". "King was the first female recipient of the 2013 Gershwin Prize for Popular Song." Ellie Greenwich and her husband Jeff Barry wrote "Then He Kissed Me", "Be My Baby" and "River Deep, Mountain High". Laura Nyro penned "Wedding Bell Blues", "Eli's Coming"  and "And When I Die". She stated "I'm not interested in conventional limitations when it comes to my songwriting....I may bring a certain feminist perspective to my songwriting." During the 1960s, both King and Goffin demonstrated the changing nature of American music as well as the emergence of new romantic and sexual patterns. "Musicians represented one of the leading edges of sexual and romantic change in American society", impacting and shifting the youth's social standards. During the late 1940s and 1950s, young people began settling into marriages and adult responsibilities at a very young age. However, King challenged the date, marriage, sex sequence by demonstrating that sex after marriage and the conventional practice of dating, is not captivating. She promoted the casualness of relationships between people and highlighted the trend of those of the opposite sex "becoming friends" with her song You've Got a Friend.

1960s: New wave of female singer-songwriters
By the late 1960s a new wave of female singer-songwriters broke from the confines of pop, writing more personal songs in the confessional style of poets like Anne Sexton and Sylvia Plath. The artists spearheading this movement were featured in Newsweek, July 1969, "The Girls: Letting Go": "What is common to them – to Joni Mitchell and Lotti Golden, to Laura Nyro, Melanie, Janis Ian and to Elyse Weinberg, are the personalized songs they write, like voyages of self-discovery." While innovating, these women also faced many struggles such as discrimination. In a male dominated publishing world, female songwriters such as Joni Mitchell want to be seen outside categories of race and gender, and into the category of pure artistry. In her 1994 interview with Alice Echol, Joni Mitchell rejected feminism but voiced her animosity towards discrimination, sex-based exclusion, and gratuitous sexualization. Echol places Mitchell's "discomfort with the feminist label into the context of her artistry". Women songwriters want to be seen as good musicians without having their talents marginalized because of their gender. Moreover, Grace Slick a former model, was widely known in rock and roll history for her role in San Francisco's burgeoning psychedelic music scene in the mid-1960s." In The Guardian, 26 January 2017, author Laura Barton describes the radical shift in subject matter – politics, drugs, disappointment, the isolation of the itinerant performer, and urban life. Native New Yorker, Lotti Golden, in her Atlantic debut album Motor-Cycle, chronicled her life in NYC's East Village in the late '60s counterculture, visiting subjects such as gender identity (The Space Queens-Silky is Sad) and excessive drug use (Gonna Fay's). The women in the 1969 Newsweek article ushered in a new age of the singer-songwriter, informing generations of women singer-songwriters.

Musical theatre
In musical theatre, "female songwriters are rare in an industry dominated by males on the creative end. Work by male songwriters is more often produced, and it was only [in 2015] that an all-female writing team made history by winning the Tony Award for Best Score." In 2015, for the first time, an all-female writing team of Lisa Kron (Best Book) and Jeanine Tesori and Kron (Best Original Score) won the Tony Award for Best Score for Fun Home, although work by male songwriters continues to be produced more often. In 2013, Cyndi Lauper was the "first female composer to win the [Tony for] Best Score without a male collaborator" for writing the music and lyrics for Kinky Boots. Female songwriters in musical theatre include singer-songwriter and actress Lauren Pritchard, who wrote Songbird; Zoe Sarnak, who wrote A Lasting Impression and The Years Between; and Katie Thompson, who would like to "see women characters... that are complicated and strong and vulnerable." Thompson stated that in the musical theatre industry, "when you fight for something as a woman, especially an artistic thing ..you are either perceived as being a bitch or you are perceived [as] 'emotional'", a label that enables others to dismiss you. The gender imbalance in musical theater exists well into the twenty-first century with women being only 3% of wind band composers and 12% of the choral composers. Despite the stigma and lack of females in musical theater, over fifty women have received international artistic recognition for composing full-length musical scores on Broadway and Off-Broadway theaters.

Black women
According to LaShonda Katrice Barnett, a college and university teacher and author of a book on black women songwriters, of the "over 380 members of the Songwriters Hall of Fame, just two are black women (Sylvia Moy and Valerie Simpson)".

African female musicians have made historical contributions to jazz, blues, rock, gospel, and other genres over the years. Several women have led the way for young Black girls hoping to become singers or rappers one day, from trailblazers like Billie Holiday, Aretha Franklin, and Diana Ross to modern idols Missy Elliott, Mariah Carey, Beyoncé, and Rihanna. Female musicians, especially Black women, nevertheless experience their jobs differently than their male counterparts, as do women in many other industries.

A persistent issue is the underrepresentation of Black female artists in both recognition and representation. One of the top musicians in the business even decided to leave the music business early due to the long-ignored problem. When Teyana Taylor, who was once contracted to G.O.O.D Music/Def Jam, released The Album in June 2020, it immediately shot to the top of the Top R&B Albums chart on Billboard. Despite its popularity, Taylor's album was overlooked for a Grammy nomination in the Best R&B Album category, where all of the nominees are men. This is surprising given the Recording Academy's commitment to increasing its diversity initiatives. "Y'all was better off just stating best MALE R&B ALBUM coz all I see is d*ck in this category," the multi-hyphenate aired her feelings on Twitter out of annoyance. Taylor made her official retirement from music in December after feeling "very undervalued."

Will music ever address its appalling lack of female representation at a time when diversity and inclusion are at the forefront of discussions? In recognition of Black History Month, we talked to four musicians about what it's like to be a Black woman in the music business: Abby Jasmine, Kiana Ledé, Mahalia, and Muni Long. Continue reading to hear our interview with them about anything from how they believe the Grammys can affect change to the difficulties they have had in obtaining opportunities and recognition.

Songwriters
The following songwriters are listed in Rolling Stone'''s 100 Greatest Songwriters of All Time. Many of these individuals are singer-songwriters who also famous for their singing and/or instrumental performance skills, but they are listed here for their accomplishments in songwriting:
Carole King
Joni Mitchell
Dolly Parton
Stevie Nicks
Madonna
Chrissie Hynde
Loretta Lynn
Lucinda Williams
Björk
Taylor Swift
Patti Smith

Western composers

American musicologist Marcia Citron has asked "[w]hy is music composed by women so marginal to the standard  'classical' repertoire?" Citron "examines the practices and attitudes that have led to the exclusion of women composers from the received 'canon' of performed musical works." She argues that in the 1800s, women composers typically wrote art songs for performance in small recitals rather than symphonies intended for performance with an orchestra in a large hall, with the latter works being seen as the most important genre for composers; since women composers did not write many symphonies, they were deemed to be not notable as composers.

According to Abbey Philips, "women musicians have had a very difficult time breaking through and getting the credit they deserve". During the Medieval eras, most of the art music was created for liturgical (religious) purposes and due to the views about the roles of women that were held by religious leaders, few women composed this type of music, with the nun Hildegard von Bingen being among the exceptions. Most university textbooks on the history of music discuss almost exclusively the role of male composers. As well, very few works by women composers are part of the standard repertoire of classical music. In the Concise Oxford History of Music, Clara Schumann is one of the only women composers who are mentioned. Philips states that "[d]uring the 20th century the women who were composing/playing gained far less attention than their male counterparts".

Medieval era

Hildegard von Bingen (1098–1179) was a German Benedictine abbess, composer, writer, philosopher, and visionary. One of her works as a composer, the Ordo Virtutum, is an early example of liturgical drama and an early morality play.  Some writers have speculated a distant origin for opera in this piece, though without any evidence.alt Opera, see Florentine Camerata in the province of Milan, Italy. Sixty-nine musical compositions, each with its own original poetic text, survive. This is one of the largest repertoires among medieval composers. Hildegard composed many liturgical songs that were collected into a cycle called the Symphonia armoniae celestium revelationum. The songs from the Symphonia are set to Hildegard's own text and range from antiphons, hymns, and sequences, to responsories. Her music is described as monophonic, using soaring melodies that pushed the boundaries of the more traditional Gregorian chant.

Renaissance era
Maddalena Casulana (1544–1590) was an Italian composer, lutenist and singer. Her first work dates from 1566: four madrigals in a collection, Il Desiderio, which she produced in Florence. Two years later she published in Venice her first book of madrigals for four voices, Il primo libro di madrigali, which is the first printed, published work by a woman in Western music history. She was close to Isabella de' Medici and dedicated some of her music to her. In 1570, 1583 and 1586 she published other books of madrigals. In the dedication to her first book of madrigals, she shows her feelings about being a female composer at a time when this was rare: "[I] want to show the world, as much as I can in this profession of music, the vain error of men that they alone possess the gifts of intellect and artistry, and that such gifts are never given to women." 
Her style is contrapuntal and chromatic and her melodic lines are singable and attentive to the text. Other composers of the time, such as Philippe de Monte, thought highly of her.

Caterina Assandra (1590–1618) was an Italian composer and Benedictine nun. She became famous as an organist and published various works. Assandra composed a number of motets and organ pieces. She studied counterpoint with Benedetto Re, one of the leading teachers at Pavia Cathedral. She composed a collection of motets in the new concertato style in Milan in 1609, an imitative eight-voice Salve Regina in 1611, and a motet, Audite verbum Dominum, for four voices in 1618. She composed traditional pieces and more innovative works. Among the latter is Duo seraphim. Her motet O Salutaris hodie, included in Motetti op. 2, was one of the first pieces to include the violone, a bowed stringed instrument.

Baroque era

Francesca Caccini (1587–1641) was an Italian composer, singer, lutenist, poet, and music teacher. Her singing for the wedding of Henry IV of France and Maria de Medici in 1600 was praised by Henry, who called her the "best singer in all of France". She worked in the Medici court as a teacher, chamber singer, rehearsal coach and composer of both chamber and stage music until 1627. By 1614 she was the court's most highly paid musician, because her musical virtuosity so well exemplified an idea of female excellence projected by Tuscany's de facto Regent, Granduchess Christina of Lorraine. Most of her stage music was composed for performance in comedies. In 1618 she published a collection of thirty-six solo songs and soprano/bass duets. In 1625 she composed a 75-minute "comedy-ballet". In all, she wrote sixteen staged works. She was a master of dramatic harmonic surprise: in her music it is harmony changes, more than counterpoint, that most powerfully communicates emotional affect.

Barbara Strozzi (1619–1677) was an Italian Baroque composer and singer. As a child, her considerable vocal talents were displayed to a wide audience. She was also compositionally gifted, and her father arranged for her to study with composer Francesco Cavalli. Strozzi was said to be "the most prolific composer – man or woman – of printed secular vocal music in Venice in the Middle of the century". Her output is also unique in that it only contains secular vocal music, with the exception of one volume of sacred songs. She was renowned for her poetic ability as well as her compositional talent. Her lyrics were often poetic and well-articulated. Nearly three-quarters of her printed works were written for soprano, but she also published works for other voices. Her compositions are firmly rooted in the seconda pratica tradition. Strozzi's music evokes the spirit of Cavalli, heir of Monteverdi.  However, her style is more lyrical, and more dependent on sheer vocal sound. Many of the texts for her early pieces were written by her father Giulio. Later texts were written by her father's colleagues, and for many compositions she may have written her own texts.

Élisabeth Jacquet de La Guerre (1665–1729) was a French composer, musician and harpsichordist. She was born into a family of musicians and master instrument-makers. A child prodigy, she performed on the harpsichord before King Louis XIV. She became a musician in the Royal Court and taught, composed, and gave concerts at home and throughout Paris, to great acclaim. She was one of the few well-known female composers of her time, and unlike many of her contemporaries, she composed in a wide variety of forms.  Her talent and achievements were acknowledged by Titon du Tillet, who accorded her a place on his Mount Parnassus when she was only 26 years old, next to Lalande and Marais and directly below Lully. Her works include a ballet, an opera (Céphale et Procris), trio sonatas, harpsichord pieces, Sonates pour le viollon et pour le clavecin and vocal works such as her Cantates françoises sur des sujets tirez de l'Ecriture.

Classical era

Harriett Abrams (1758–1821) was an English composer and soprano. As a singer, she was praised for her performances of George Frideric Handel. She studied singing, music theory, and composition with composer Thomas Arne before making her opera début in 1775 at the Theatre Royal, Drury Lane in London. Abrams became a principal singer at the fashionable London concerts and provincial festivals, appearing regularly from 1780 to 1790. Abrams composed several songs, two of which, "The Orphan's Prayer" and "Crazy Jane", became popular. She published two sets of Italian and English canzonets, a collection of Scottish songs and glees harmonized for two and three voices, and more than a dozen songs, mainly sentimental ballads. A collection of songs published in 1803 was dedicated by Harriett to Queen Charlotte.

Maria Teresa Agnesi (1720–1795) was an Italian composer.  Though she was most famous for her compositions, she was also an accomplished harpsichordist and singer. The majority of her surviving compositions were written for keyboard, the voice, or both. Her career was made possible by the Austrian Lombardy, which was progressive and enlightened in women's rights. Her patron was Maria Theresia, holy Roman Empress and sovereign of Lombardy, and Maria Antonia Walpurgis, a gifted composer and contemporary. Her early works are simple and clean, while her later works are more virtuosic, complex, and melodramatic. She composed operas, including heroic drama and serious drama styles. She also wrote arias, concertos and sonatas for keyboard, small ensemble and voice.

Princess Anna Amalia (1723–1787) was a Prussian composer and score curator. She learned to play the harpsichord, flute, and violin as a young woman. She became the Abbess of Quedlinburg in 1755. She spent most of her time in Berlin, where she devoted herself to music, and became a musical patron and composer. As a composer she achieved a modest amount of fame and is most known for her smaller chamber works, which included trios, marches, cantatas, songs and fugues. In 1758, she studied musical theory and composition with Johann Philipp Kirnberger, a student of Johann Sebastian Bach. She composed chamber music such as flute sonatas. More, she set the text of Ramler's Passion cantata Der Tod Jesu ("The Death of Jesus") to music. She was also a collector of music, preserving over 600 volumes of works by Johann Sebastian Bach, George Frideric Handel, Georg Philipp Telemann, Karl Heinrich Graun and Carl Philipp Emanuel Bach, among others. Her works of curation are a significant contribution to Western culture.

Elisabeth Olin (1740–1828) was a Swedish opera singer and composer. She debuted as Alfhild in Syrinx referred to as Sweden's first native Opera comique, at Bollhuset in 1747. She became a famed vocalist in the regular public concerts at Riddarhuset in Stockholm, and published her own compositions; she was one of the Swedish composers who wrote one composition each for the collection Gustaviade. En hjältedikt i tolv sånger ('Gustaviade. A heroic poem of twelve songs') from 1768; where she wrote the composition number eight. At the inauguration performance and foundation of the Royal Swedish Opera on 18 January 1773, she sang the role of the Sea Goddess Thetis in Francesco Uttini's opera Thetis och Pélée. She remained the primadonna of the Swedish opera for a decade. In 1773, she became the first female to be granted the title Hovsångare, and in 1782, she was inducted as the first female member of the Royal Swedish Academy of Music.

Henriette Adélaïde Villard de Beaumesnil (1748–1813) was a French composer and opera singer. She began working in minor comedy roles from the age of seven and debuted as a soloist at the Paris Opera in 1766.Cook, Elizabeth Beaumesnil, Henriette Adélaïde Villard de, in Sadie, Stanley (ed.), The New Grove Dictionary of Opera, Grove (Oxford University Press), New York, 1997, I, p. 366.  She was the second woman to have a composition performed at the Paris Opéra. Previously the Paris Opera had staged the tragédie-lyrique Céphale et Procris by Élisabeth Jacquet de La Guerre, in 1694. Anacréon, her first opera, received a private performance at the residence of the Count of Provence in 1781. In 1784, her opera Tibulle et Délie was performed at the Paris Opera. In 1792, her two-act opéra comique, Plaire, c'est commander was performed at the Théâtre Montansier.

Anna Bon (1739–1767?) was an Italian composer and performer. She attended the Ospedale della Pietà in Venice, where she studied with the maestra di viola, Candida della Pièta. She held the new post of 'chamber music virtuosa' at the court of Margrave Friedrich of Brandenburg Kulmbach. She dedicated her six op. 1 flute sonatas, published in Nürnberg in 1756, to Friedrich. In 1762 she moved to the Esterházy court at Eisenstadt, where she remained until 1765. She dedicated the published set of six harpsichord sonatas, op. 2 (1757), to Ernestina Augusta Sophia, Princess of Saxe-Weimar, and the set of six divertimenti (trio sonatas), op. 3 (1759), to Charles Theodore, Elector of Bavaria. She also wrote six divertimenti for two flutes and basso continuo; an aria, "Astra coeli", for soprano, 2 violins, viola, and basso continuo; an offertory, "Ardete amore", for singers, instruments and basso continuo; a motet, "Eia in preces et veloces", for alto, 2 violins, viola, and basso continuo and an opera.

Jane Mary Guest (1762–1846) was an English composer and pianist. A pupil of Johann Christian Bach, and initially composing in the galante style, she composed keyboard sonatas, other keyboard works and vocal works with keyboard accompaniment. She was piano teacher to Princess Amelia and Princess Charlotte of Wales. She performed in London from 1779, giving subscription concerts there in 1783/84. She was known for her expressive style of playing. Around this time she published her Six Sonatas, Op. 1, which gained extensive subscriptions, including from royalty, and which were also published in Paris in 1784 and Berlin in 1785. In addition to her keyboard sonatas, she also composed other keyboard pieces, such as her Introduction and March from Rossini's Ricciardo e Zoraide (1820) and a number of songs with keyboard accompaniment.

Marianne von Martínez (1744–1812) was an Austrian composer, singer and pianist. Metastasio noticed her precocious talents and came to oversee her musical education, which included keyboard lessons from Haydn, singing lessons with Porpora and composition lessons with Johann Adolph Hasse and the Imperial court composer Giuseppe Bonno. She was a native speaker of both Italian and German and knew French and English. As a child, she played for the Imperial court, where she "attracted attention with her beautiful voice and her keyboard playing". As an adult, she was frequently asked to perform before the Empress Maria Theresa. A number of the works that Marianna composed are set for solo voice. She wrote a number of secular cantatas and two oratorios to Italian texts. Surviving compositions include four masses, six motets, and three litanies for choir. She wrote in the Italian style, as was typical for the early Classical period in Vienna.  Her harpsichord performance practice was compared to the style of C.P.E. Bach. Her Italian oratorio Isacco figura del redentore was premiered by massive forces in 1782.

Romantic era

Maria Szymanowska (1789–1831) was a well-known Polish composer and pianist. She wrote in many of the same genres as fellow Pole Frederic Chopin (1810–1849). Szymanowska maintained connections with several famous nineteenth-century people, including Gioacchino Rossini, Johann Wolfgang von Goethe, and Adam Mickiewicz, Poland's greatest poet.

Fanny Mendelssohn (1805–1847) was one of the best-known women composers of the 1800s. She showed prodigious musical ability as a child and began to write music. Even though famous visitors to her family home were equally impressed by Fanny and her brother Felix Mendelssohn, Fanny was limited by prevailing attitudes of the time toward women. Her father was tolerant, rather than supportive, of her activities as a composer. Her father wrote to her in 1820, telling her that "[m]usic will perhaps become his [i.e. Felix's] profession, while for you it can and must be only an ornament [in your life]". Felix cautioned her against publishing her works under her own name and seeking a career in music. He wrote:
'From my knowledge of Fanny I should say that she has neither inclination nor vocation for [musical] authorship. She is too much all that a woman ought to be for this. She regulates her house, and neither thinks of the public nor of the musical world, nor even of music at all, until her first duties are fulfilled. Publishing would only disturb her in these, and I cannot say that I approve of it'.  

Clara Schumann (1819–1896) was a German composer and concert pianist who had a 61-year concert career, which changed the format and repertoire of the piano recital and the tastes of the listening public. From an early age, she had a one-hour lesson in piano, violin, singing, theory, harmony, composition, and counterpoint. In 1830, at the age of eleven, she had become a virtuoso soloist and she left on a concert tour of European cities. In the late 1830s, she performed to sell-out crowds and laudatory critical reviews. Frédéric Chopin described her playing to Franz Liszt, who came to hear one of her concerts and subsequently "praised her extravagantly" in a letter that was published in the Parisian Revue et Gazette Musicale. She was named a Königliche und Kaiserliche Kammervirtuosin ("Royal and Imperial Chamber Virtuoso"), Austria's highest musical honor.

She was also instrumental in changing the kind of programs expected of concert pianists. In her early career, before her marriage to Robert Schumann, she played what was then customary, mainly bravura pieces designed to showcase the artist's technique, often in the form of arrangements or variations on popular themes from operas, written by virtuosos such as Thalberg, Herz, or Henselt. As it was also customary to play one's own compositions, she included at least one of her own works in every program, works such as her Variations on a Theme by Bellini (Op. 8) and her popular Scherzo (Op. 10). Her works include songs, piano pieces, a piano concerto, a piano trio, choral pieces, and three Romances for violin and piano. 

 20th and 21st century 

Katherine Hoover (1937–2018) studied music at the University of Rochester and the Eastman School of Music, where she earned a Performance Certificate in Flute and a Bachelor's of Music in Music Theory in 1959. She started publishing professional works in 1965, with her Duet for Two Violins. Hoover was the winner of the National Flute Association's Newly Published Music Competition twice, first in 1987 with her piece Medieval Suite and second in 1991 with her piece Kokopelli for solo flute. These pieces use many extended techniques for flute, such as pitch bending. Many of her works have been recorded by renowned musicians and performed in Carnegie Hall.

Joan Tower (born 1938) wrote her 1976 piece Black Topaz, which features many tonal melodies and harmonies. She received her DMA in composition from Columbia University in 1978. She was commissioned in 1979 by the American Composers Orchestra, resulting in her first orchestral work, Sequoia. This has been performed by numerous orchestras worldwide. From 1985 to 1988 Tower was the composer-in-residence at the St. Louis Symphony. In 1990 she was the first woman to win the Grawemeyer Award for Music Composition, which included a prize of $150,000. Since then, Tower has been the composer-in-residence at numerous music festivals, including the Norfolk Chamber Music Festival and Tanglewood Contemporary Music Festival. Tower has been a professor of music at Bard College in New York since 1982 and is considered one of the most influential women composers of the 20th century.

Ellen Taaffe Zwilich (born 1939) received her doctorate in composition from Juilliard and was the first woman to ever achieve this. The same year, she won a gold medal at the International Composition Competition in Italy. In 1983 Zwilich made history again, becoming the first woman to win the Pulitzer Prize in music for her Symphony No. 1. Since this success, she has received many commissions. Her piece Millennium has been performed by twenty-seven orchestras since its premiere in 2000. She has been the Francis Eppes Professor of Music at Florida State University since 1999. Zwilich is known to have an 'eclectic millennial voice' in her compositions, utilizing a clear design and rich timbres. Though her music was originally very dissonant and influenced by the Second Viennese School, her style became more emotional after the death of her husband.

Libby Larsen (born 1950) earned her MM in 1975 from the University of Minnesota and her PhD from the same school in 1978. In 1973 she co-founded the Minnesota Composers Forum, now known as the American Composer's Forum. Larsen was the composer-in-residence at the Minnesota Orchestra from 1983 to 1987. Larsen composed over 220 works, including orchestra, dance, opera, choral, theater, chamber, and solo repertoire. Her pieces have been performed across the United States and Europe. Larsen is a strong supporter of contemporary music and female musicians, and she won a Grammy Award for her CD The Art of Arleen Auger in 1994. Larsen won the Lifetime Achievement Award from the Academy of Arts and Letters in 2000 and published her book The Concert Hall That Fell Asleep and Woke Up as a Car Radio in 2007.

Jennifer Higdon (born 1962) earned an MA and PhD from the University of Philadelphia in 1994. Higdon has received awards from the Guggenheim Foundation, American Academy of Arts and Letters, International League of Women's Composers, and others. Her 1996 work Shine was named Best Contemporary Piece by USA Today. Of Higdon's many pieces, blue cathedral is most frequently performed. In 2010, Higdon won the Grammy award of Best Contemporary Classical Composition for her Percussion Concerto. Also in 2010 she won the Pulitzer Prize in Music for her composition Violin Concerto, premiered by Hilary Hahn.

Additional female composers are listed below. Some are also performers (e.g. Agnes Tyrrell, Amy Beach and Verdina Shlonsky were noted pianists). For a full list, see List of female composers by birth year.
Agnes Tyrrell (1846–1883)
Ethel Smyth (1858–1944) 
Amy Beach (1867–1944)
Dora Pejačević (1885–1923)
Florence Price (1887–1953)
Nadia Boulanger (1887–1979)
Lili Boulanger (1893–1918)
Verdina Shlonsky (1905–1990)
Imogen Holst (1907–1984)
Violet Archer (1913–2000)
Vítězslava Kaprálová (1915–1940)
Thea Musgrave (born 1928)
Sofia Gubaidulina (born 1931)

Instrumental performers

Popular music

Individuals and bandleaders

Women have a high prominence in many popular music styles as singers. However, professional women instrumentalists are uncommon in popular music, especially in rock genres such as heavy metal. "[P]laying in a band is largely a male homosocial activity, that is, learning to play in a band is largely a peer-based... experience, shaped by existing sex-segregated friendship networks. As well, rock music "is often defined as a form of male rebellion vis-à-vis female bedroom culture." In popular music, there has been a gendered "distinction between public (male) and private (female) participation" in music. "[S]everal scholars have argued that men exclude women from bands or from the bands' rehearsals, recordings, performances, and other social activities." "Women are mainly regarded as passive and private consumers of allegedly slick, prefabricated – hence, inferior – pop music..., excluding them from participating as high status rock musicians." One of the reasons that there are rarely mixed gender bands is that "bands operate as tight-knit units in which homosocial solidarity – social bonds between people of the same sex... – plays a crucial role." In the 1960s pop music scene, "[s]inging was sometimes an acceptable pastime for a girl, but playing an instrument...simply wasn't done."

"The rebellion of rock music was largely a male rebellion; the women—often, in the 1950s and '60s, girls in their teens—in rock usually sang songs as personæ utterly dependent on their macho boyfriends...". Philip Auslander says that "Although there were many women in rock by the late 1960s, most performed only as singers, a traditionally feminine position in popular music". Though some women played instruments in American all-female garage rock bands, none of these bands achieved more than regional success. So they "did not provide viable templates for women's on-going participation in rock". In relation to the gender composition of heavy metal bands, it has been said that "[h]eavy metal performers are almost exclusively male" "[a]t least until the mid-1980s" apart from "exceptions such as Girlschool." However, "now [in the 2010s] maybe more than ever–strong metal women have put up their dukes and got down to it", "carv[ing] out a considerable place for [them]selves."
When Suzi Quatro emerged in 1973, "no other prominent female musician worked in rock simultaneously as a singer, instrumentalist, songwriter, and bandleader". According to Auslander, she was "kicking down the male door in rock and roll and proving that a female musician ... and this is a point I am extremely concerned about ... could play as well if not better than the boys".

A number of these artists are also sang and wrote songs, but they are listed here for their instrumental skills:
Joni Mitchell
Bonnie Raitt
Nancy Wilson
Kaki King
Orianthi
Sister Rosetta Tharpe
Jennifer Batten
Mary Ford
Lita Ford
Joan Jett
Carole King
Tal Wilkenfeld
Shirley Horn
Eva Cassidy
Ruth Brown
Marian Anderson
Gunhild Carling (multi-instrumentalist)

All-female bands and girl groups
An all-female band is a musical group in popular music genres such as blues, jazz and related genres which is exclusively composed of female musicians. This is distinct from a girl group, in which the female members are solely vocalists, though this terminology is not universally followed. While all-male bands are common in many rock and pop bands, all-female bands are less common.

A girl group is a music act featuring several female singers who generally harmonize together. The term "girl group" is also used in a narrower sense within English-speaking countries to denote the wave of American female pop music singing groups which flourished in the late 1950s and early 1960s between the decline of early rock and roll and the British Invasion, many of whom were influenced by doo-wop style. All-female bands are sometimes also called girl groups.

These all-female bands were difficult to maintain, as many earlier groups struggled with replacing female musicians once they departed, and some were forced to open the band to men to avoid quitting.

1930s–1960s
In the Jazz Age and during the 1930s, all-female bands such as The Blue Belles, the Parisian Redheads (later the Bricktops), Lil-Hardin's All-Girl Band, The Ingenues, The Harlem Playgirls, Phil Spitalny's Musical Sweethearts and "Helen Lewis and Her All-Girl Jazz Syncopators" were popular.Ina Ray Hutton led an all-girl band, the Melodears, from 1934 to 1939.  Eunice Westmoreland, under the name Rita Rio, led an all-female band appearing on NBC Radio and for Vitaphone and RKO. A Polish group Filipinki was established in 1959.

Groups composed solely of women began to emerge with the advent of rock and roll. Among the earliest all-female rock bands to be signed to a record label were Goldie & the Gingerbreads, to Atlantic Records in 1964, The Pleasure Seekers with Suzi Quatro to Hideout Records in 1964 and Mercury Records in 1968, The Feminine Complex to Athena Records in 1968, and Fanny (who pioneered the all-female band sound in the early to mid-1970s) in 1969 when Mo Ostin signed them to Warner Bros. Records.  There were also others, such as The Liverbirds (1962–1967), the Ace of Cups (1967), The Heart Beats (1968), Ariel (1968–1970), and the New Coon Creek Girls (1930s).

1970s–1980s
In 1971 Fanny became the first all-female band to reach the Hot 100's top 40, with "Charity Ball" peaking at No. 40. In 1975, the Canadian duo of sisters, Kate and Anna McGarrigle, recorded the first of a string of albums. The Runaways were an early commercially successful, hard-edged, all-female hard rock band, releasing their first album in 1976: band members Joan Jett, Cherie Currie and Lita Ford all went on to solo careers. The 1980s, for the first time, saw long-sought chart success from all-female bands and female-fronted rock bands.  On the Billboard Hot 100-year-end chart for 1982 Joan Jett's "I Love Rock 'n' Roll" at No. 3 and the Go-Go's "We Got the Beat" at No. 25 sent a message out to many industry heads that females who could play could bring in money. 
In 1989, one of the most famous female bands, the Dixie Chicks, began playing on street corners in Dallas, Texas. This band consists of a trio of Natalie Maines as lead singer, Natalie Maguire on the fiddle and mandolin, and Emily Robison, master of banjo, the Dobro, guitar, and the accordion. The Dixie Chicks sold more CDs than all other country music groups combined. They won five Grammys, in 2000, the Country Music Association's Album of the Year, and the Vocal Group of the Year award in 2002. Another famous female band includes the WildWood Girls. Originally the WildWood Pickers beginning in 1979 from the Chicago area, the all female band began after the band became a family affair and later, they changed their name to WildWood Girls in 1982, resulting in twice as many bookings. They embarked on overseas tours for the USO and Department of Defense, they worked as a band at Dollywood for about 5 years, and they played many times at Bill Monroe's Bean Blossom Festival in Indiana for 10 years. They released six recordings, despite the issues they ran into regarding the fact that they were an all girls band. Yet, another famous band is the Happy Hollow String brand (1974–1979). They were an all female bluegrass band with Sandy Crisco on banjo. Crisco reported that it was difficult to find the ladies restroom during bookings, as due to the lack of female performers, many male instrumentalists did not know where it was.

Punk

In the United Kingdom, the advent of punk in the late 1970s with its "anyone can do it" ethos led to women making significant contributions. In contrast to the rock music and heavy metal scenes of the 1970s, which were dominated by men, the anarchic, counter-cultural mindset of the punk scene in mid- and late 1970s encouraged women to participate. "That was the beauty of the punk thing," Chrissie Hynde later said." [Sexual] discrimination didn't exist in that scene." This participation played a role in the historical development of punk music, especially in the U.S. and U.K. at that time, and continues to influence and enable future generations.

Rock historian Helen Reddington states that the popular image of young punk women musicians as focused on the fashion aspects of the scene (fishnet stockings, spiky blond hair, etc.) was stereotypical. She states that many, if not most women punks were more interested in the ideology and socio-political implications, rather than the fashion. Music historian Caroline Coon contends that before punk, women in rock music were virtually invisible; in contrast, in punk, she argues "[i]t would be possible to write the whole history of punk music without mentioning any male bands at all – and I think a lot of [people] would find that very surprising." Johnny Rotten wrote that "During the Pistols era, women were out there playing with the men, taking us on in equal terms ... It wasn't combative, but compatible." Women were involved in bands such as The Slits, The Raincoats, Mo-dettes, and Dolly Mixture, The Innocents.

Others take issue with the notion of equal recognition, such as guitarist Viv Albertine, who stated that "the A&R men, the bouncers, the sound mixers, no one took us seriously.. So, no, we got no respect anywhere we went. People just didn't want us around." The anti-establishment stance of punk opened the space for women who were treated like outsiders in a male-dominated industry. Sonic Youth's Kim Gordon states, "I think women are natural anarchists, because you're always operating in a male framework."

Heavy metal

The all-female heavy metal band Girlschool, from South London, formed in 1978 out of the ashes of Painted Lady. While somewhat successful in the UK, they became better known in the early 1980s. One of the original members of the band, Kathy Valentine departed to join the all-female band The Go-Go's, switching from guitar to bass. Among Girlschool's early recordings was an EP titled "The St. Valentines Day Massacre" which they recorded with Bronze label-mates Motörhead under the name Headgirl. In 1974, The Deadly Nightshade, a rock/country band, was signed by Phantom. Women in the heavy metal genre tend to have to limit themselves due to the genre being very male orientated.

Grunge
While there is a perception that the groups in the 1980s and 1990s alternative rock genre of grunge were "overwhelmingly male", women were represented in grunge bands such as L7, Lunachicks, Dickless, STP, 7 Year Bitch, Courtney Love's group Hole and Babes in Toyland, the latter an "all-female Minneapolis band", and grunge was "inextricably linked with Riot Grrrl", an underground feminist punk movement. Women instrumentalists include the bassists D'arcy Wretzky and Melissa Auf der Maur from The Smashing Pumpkins and drummers Patty Schemel (Hole and Courtney Love projects) and Lori Barbero of Babes in Toyland.

Rock music's grunge genre, which peaked in the late 1980s and early 1990s, as well as its associated fashion. The murky-guitar bands that developed from Seattle in the late 1980s as a link between popular 1980s heavy metal-hard rock and post-punk alternative rock are known as grunge. Most notably, these bands include Nirvana and Pearl Jam.

Grunge was born on Seattle's independent Sub Pop record label as Mudhoney, Nirvana, Screaming Trees, and Soundgarden followed in the footsteps of the Melvins, a pioneering Northwestern band, and incorporated elements of punk rock, hardcore-punk inheritors of its DIY ethic, such as Hüsker Dü, and the sound of 1970s heavy metal bands such as Black Sabbath, Led Zeppelin, and AC/DC.

The Melvins, a band from the Midwest. Nirvana and Pearl Jam garnered a quickly expanding following, signed to major labels, and created albums that sold millions of copies by fusing guitar distortion, agonized vocals, and sincere, angst-ridden lyrics. Following their triumph, Seattle, which was already enjoying an economic boom as a result of the Microsoft Corporation's rapid expansion, attracted record industry professionals seeking for the next big thing. With the help of the media, grunge quickly gained popularity abroad. As a result, American department stores began carrying imitations of the flannel shirts, thermal underwear, combat boots, and stocking caps that Seattle bands and their followers favored.

When Nirvana's Kurt Cobain passed away in 1994, the grunge movement eventually waned. This was partly due to Cobain's role as a generational spokesperson as well as the underwhelming album sales of many Seattle-based bands who were never able to break through. Yet, grunge significantly contributed to the mainstreaming of alternative rock.

1990s–2000s
In the 1990s, musician's magazines were starting to view female musicians more seriously, putting Bonnie RaittBonnie Raitt cover story, Guitar Player Magazine, July 1998 and Tina Weymouth on their covers. While The Go-Go's and The Bangles, both from the LA club scene, were the first all-female rock bands to find sustained success, individual musicians paved the way for the industry to seek out bands that had female musicians.

In the 1990s, bands such as Hole, Super Heroines, The Lovedolls and L7 became popular, while demonstrating on stage, and in interviews, a self-confident and  "bad" attitude at times, always willing to challenge assumptions about how an all-female band should behave. Courtney Love described the other females in Hole as using a more "lunar viewpoint" in their roles as musicians. In the 1990s, the punk, female-led Riot Grrrl genre was associated with bands such as Bratmobile and Bikini Kill. Destiny's Child was a female American group composed of Beyoncé Knowles, Kelly Rowland, and Michelle Williams. Destiny's Child began as Girl's Tyme, in 1990 and years later, it was signed to Columbia Records and Music World Entertainment as Destiny's Child in 1997. Destiny's Child's best-selling second album was The Writing's on the Wall (1999), which included  "Bills, Bills, Bills" and "Say My Name". Additionally, the Spice Girls was a British all girl pop group that formed in 1994. The band is composed of Mel B, Melanie C, Emma Bunton, Geri Halliwell, and Victoria Beckham. They signed with Virgin Records and their single "Wannabe" came out in 1996 and was deemed as number one in 37 countries.

2000s–2010s
In the 2000s, all female and female fronted bands started using their influence to promote feminism and females in the music industry. Bands like The Distillers, fronted by Brody Dalle, influenced the rise of street punk. St. Vincent started gaining more traction and eventually appeared on the cover of Guitar World magazine. St. Vincent wore a T-shirt with a bikini decal on the magazine cover, a comment on how when women appear with guitars, they're usually dressed very minimally, as a marketing tool to sell the instruments. Haim, a band composed of three sisters, is extremely outspoken when it comes to the promotion of women in music, calling out major music festivals for the lack of female-fronted bands on bills and the lack of payment for female artists as compared to male artists of the same level. In recent years, the lack of female representation in music has been a major controversial point in the industry. Female musicians and bands are constantly overlooked in favor of male artists, however many people in the music industry have been making an effort to change this.

 2010s–2018 
From 2010 to 2018, many girl bands have emerged and became more popular. One of the most famous girl bands is Little Mix (2011), a British band that originated on The X Factor and is composed of Jesy Nelson, Leigh-Anne Pinnock, Jade Thirlwall, and Perrie Edwards. Little Mix is the first all female group since the Pussycat Dolls to reach the US top five with their album DNA (2012). They also broke the record held by the Spice Girls by earning the highest debut US chart position for a British girl group's first release. Additionally, Fifth Harmony is an American female group that is based in Miami and composed of Ally Brooke, Normani Kordei, Dinah Jane, Lauren Jauregui, and Camila Cabello until her departure in 2016. This group was also on the X Factor in 2012. Their three studio albums charted on the top ten of the US Billboard 200.

Jazz

Historically, the majority of well-known women performers in jazz have been singers, such as Ella Fitzgerald, Billie Holiday, Diane Schuur and Dinah Washington. Culture Trip notes that women in jazz have been "too often confined to the role of chanteuse." However, there are many instrumental performers. In some cases, these musicians are also composers and bandleaders:
 Toshiko Akiyoshi (b. 1929): bandleader, pianist, arranger, composer
 Regina Carter: jazz violin
 Melba Liston: trombonist and arranger
 Vi Redd (b. 1928): alto saxophonist 
 Melissa Aldana: tenor saxophonist 
 Emily Remler: jazz guitar
 Mimi Fox: jazz guitar
Sweet Emma Barrett
Terri Lyne Carrington (drums)
Carla Bley (piano)
Mary Lou Williams (piano)
Billie Pierce (piano)
Jeanette Kimball (piano)
Lovie Austin (piano and bandleader)
Joelle Khoury (piano and composer)
Shirley Horn
Eva Cassidy
Ruth Brown

There have also been all-female jazz bands such as The International Sweethearts of Rhythm and all female orchestras such as the Hour of Charm Orchestra. Often, during World War II, these all women's groups would entertain the troops while the male musicians served. However, after the war, these girls groups were thrown aside, as male musicians returned and the public favored the "normalcy" it brought, and the over sexualization of females in music returned.

Some of these musicians helped shape jazz music and American culture. When June Norton was young, she wanted to pursue classical music, in hopes that one day she could join the opera. However, this did not seem possible, so she began to pursue popular music. Norton became the first black woman in the region of Washington, D.C., to appear singing in TV commercials marketed towards southern states. This led to her accomplishments of many awards including the 1962 Achievement Award from the National Association of Colored Women, the TV Personality of the Year award, the 1962 Emphasis Award from the National Association of Market Development, and the 1962 Singer of the Year Award from the YMCA. She later stepped away from the spotlight and began a career as a counselor and married Thomas C. Cuff. She spent the rest of her working years helping underprivileged youth and female prisoners.

Another female pianist, composer, and vocalist made significant contribution to jazz and the American culture. Shirley Horn (1934–2005) recorded more than 25 albums and worked as a side musician for Stuff Smith, Toots Thielemans, Charlie Haden, and Oscar Peterson. She practiced at the Howard University Junior School of Music, and later received offers from Juilliard University and Xavier University, but opted to remain in Washington, D.C., marry, and have a child. She continued to tour and play gigs constantly. Her first recording was part of Stuff Smith's 1959 release, Cat on a Hot Fiddle. Her debut recording, Embers and Ashes attracted a large amount of attention and helped her to realize she wanted to be a concert pianist after all. A few months after this, Miles Davis contacted Horn and told Village Vanguard in New York City that he wanted Horn to open for him, and that he refused to play if this was not a possibility. This is when Horn's fame and reputation began to rise. She continued to work with Mercury Records and Verve Records. She received many awards including a Grammy Award in 1999 for Best Jazz vocal album for I Remember Miles, five Washington Area Music Awards, an honorary music degree from the Berklee College of Music, and a 2004 NEA Jazz Master Fellowship and Award from the National Endowment for the Arts.

Classical music
Instrumentalists in classical music may focus on one specific type of playing, such as solo recitals, solo concertos, chamber music, or performing as a member of an orchestra, or they may do different types. Some musicians who play orchestral instruments may do all of these types of performances. Instrumentalists in classical music may do both live performances for an audience and recordings. In some cases, classical performers may do mostly live performances. There has traditionally been a gendered aspect to playing instruments in classical music.

Many album covers for female classical musicians have photographs that emphasize the physical attractiveness of the performer, "often using risqué images". According to Jessica Duchen, a music writer for London's The Independent, Classical women musicians are "too often judged for their appearances, rather than their talent" and they face pressure "to look sexy onstage and in photos." Duchen states that while "[t]here are women musicians who refuse to play on their looks,...the ones who do tend to be more materially successful."

Orchestra

Historically, orchestras tended to be almost exclusively male, with the exception of the harp player, as the harp was considered a "women's instrument". A music newspaper editorial in 1917 in England encouraged orchestras to allow women to play the "lighter instruments", with the understanding that these women performers would relinquish their positions to men once WW I was over. In the 1990s, to reduce the likelihood of gender bias, some orchestras began conducting auditions of potential new members behind a screen, so the audition panel could not see if it was a male or female performer. Historically, there has been a tendency for brass sections to be male, and some women brass players have alleged that there is gender bias against female brass players. A study in the 1980s found that women made up 36% of US orchestras; 30% in the United Kingdom, and 16% in East and West Germany. Women tended to be hired by lower paid orchestras and they were less present in major orchestras. In 1922, harpist Stephanie Goldner became the first female member of the New York Philharmonic. One hundred years later, in 2022, the number of women members outnumbered the men in the Philharmonic.

In the past, the Vienna Philharmonic Orchestra argued that "ethnic and gender uniformity" gave their orchestra a better sound. Several male VPO musicians stated in a 1996 interview that classical music has "gender-defined qualities which can be most clearly expressed by male uniformity" in the orchestra. One male VPO member stated that men "carry secrets that are involved with music and tones, just like in Australian aboriginal or Indian cultures where men play certain instruments, and not the women." One male VPO performer stated that "pregnancy brings problems.  It brings disorder.  Another important argument against women is that they can bring the solidarity of the men in question. You find that in all men's groups."

The Vienna Philharmonic did not accept women to permanent membership until 1997, far later than comparable orchestras (of the other orchestras ranked among the world's top five by Gramophone in 2008, the last to appoint a woman to a permanent position was the Berlin Philharmonic.) As late as February 1996, first flautist Dieter Flury told Westdeutscher Rundfunk that accepting women would be "gambling with the emotional unity that this organism currently has". In April 1996, the orchestra's press secretary wrote that "compensating for the expected leaves of absence" of maternity leave was a problem.

In 1997, the orchestra was "facing protests during a [US] tour" by the National Organization for Women and International Association of Women in Music. Finally, "after being held up to increasing ridicule even in socially conservative Austria, members of the orchestra gathered [on 28 February 1997] in an extraordinary meeting on the eve of their departure and agreed to admit a woman, Anna Lelkes, as harpist." As of 2013, the orchestra has six female members; one of them, violinist Albena Danailova became one of the orchestra's concertmasters in 2008, the first woman to hold that position. In 2012, women still made up just 6% of the orchestra's membership, compared to 14% in the Berlin Philharmonic, 30% in the London Symphony Orchestra, and 36% in the New York Philharmonic. VPO president Clemens Hellsberg said the VPO now uses completely screened blind auditions. She said it chooses "the best we get," implying that full gender equity would take time as older members retire and new ones audition under gender-neutral conditions. The Czech Philharmonic excludes women and the Berlin Philharmonic "has a history of gender discrimination."

In 2013, an article in Mother Jones stated that "[m]any prestigious orchestras have significant female membership—women outnumber men in the New York Philharmonic's violin section—and several renowned ensembles, including the National Symphony Orchestra, the Detroit Symphony, and the Minnesota Symphony, are led by women violinists. Brass, percussion, and string-bass orchestra sections are still predominantly male."

Soloists
In classical music, soloists may perform unaccompanied solos on their instrument, as occurs with pianists who play works for solo piano or stringed instruments who play Baroque suites for one instrument (e.g., Bach suites for solo cello). In many cases, though, soloists are accompanied, either by a pianist, a small chamber music ensemble, or, in the case of a concerto, by a full symphony orchestra. In the 2014–2015 season, the majority of concerto soloists who performed with major Canadian orchestras were male. In the Vancouver Symphony Orchestra, 67% of the concerto soloists were male. In the Toronto Symphony Orchestra, 74% of the concerto soloists were male. In the National Arts Centre Orchestra, 79% of the concerto soloists were male. In the Orchestre Symphonique de Montreal, 84% of the concerto soloists were male. When the CBC news story on the gender balance of concerto soloists was released, the conductor of the Vancouver Symphony Orchestra, Bramwell Tovey, disputed the accuracy of the news story in regards to his orchestra, arguing that the article only took a single season into account.
An internationally famed soloist is Argentina's Martha Argerich who is considered to be one of the greatest pianists of the recorded era.

Singers

Popular music

Singers in popular music perform the vocals for bands and other music groups, which may range in size from a duo or a power trio to a large jazz big band. Singers typically do both live performances and studio recordings. Singers who do live performances may sing in small venues such as coffeehouses or nightclubs, or they may perform in larger venues ranging from arts centres to stadiums. Some singers also perform in music videos, which are used to promote the songs. In some styles of music, singers may play a rhythm section instrument, such as rhythm guitar, electric bass or a percussion instrument while they sing. In some styles of pop, singers perform choreographed dance moves during the show. Three well-known examples of pop singers who perform elaborate dance routines in their live shows are Madonna, Beyoncé and Britney Spears. Madonna is a key figure in popular music; critics have retrospectively credited her presence, success and contributions with paving the way for every female artist after her debut, and changing forever the music scene for women in the music history, as well as for today's pop stars.

Singer-songwriter and music producer Bjork has commented on how "women's labor and expertise—inside and outside of the music industry—go unnoticed." She has stated that "[I]t's invisible, what women do," and "[I]t's not rewarded as much." Bjork states "that her male collaborators are typically credited for the sound of her records; because on stage she mainly sings, there is a widespread assumption that she neither produces [as a music producer] nor plays an instrument." In 2015, "while accepting the Woman of the Year honor at this year's Billboard Women in Music event", Lady Gaga commented on the "difficulties of being a female recording artist." She said it "is really hard sometimes for women in music. It's like a f[uck]ing boys club that we just can't get in to." She stated that she "tried for so long... to be taken seriously as a musician for my intelligence more than my body", yet she felt that others in the industry did not believe that women could have a "musical background... [or] understand what you're doing because you're a female." A University Press of Kentucky book states that customers did not treat a woman who worked at a guitar store like she knew anything about guitars until she would use special guitar terms. Indie folk singer-songwriter/guitarist Ani di Franco states that for women, in the past, even entering a guitar store was an "act of courage" because it felt like a "boys' club". Not only do female artists feel the pressure to please their male counterparts but it is also difficult for female DJs to fit in, in a male-dominated field.

Despite funk's popularity in modern music, few people have examined the work of funk women. As cultural critic Cheryl Keyes explains in her essay "She Was too Black for Rock and too hard for Soul: (Re)discovering the Musical Career of Betty Mabry Davis," most of the scholarship around funk has focused on the cultural work of men. She states that "Betty Davis is an artist whose name has gone unheralded as a pioneer in the annals of funk and rock. Most writing on these musical genres has traditionally placed male artist like Jimi Hendrix, George Clinton (of Parliament-Funkadelic), and bassist Larry Graham as trendsetters in the shaping of a rock music sensibility" (35). Funk women include Chaka Khan, Labelle, Brides of Funkenstein, Klymaxx, Mother's Finest, and Betty Davis.

Below are some of the top-earning female singers in the 2010s. Almost all of these singers are also songwriters, and some are also music producers:

Adele
Beyoncé
Lady Gaga
Madonna
Kylie Minogue
Katy Perry
Rihanna
Britney Spears
Taylor Swift
Ariana Grande
Celine Dion
Mariah Carey
Jennifer Lopez
Shakira

In East Asian pop music, during the 2010s, Japanese idol girl groups have been very successful in what is the largest physical music market in the world – and second largest overall -, with 17 number-one singles just in 2017. The best-selling among all the J-pop idol girl groups, AKB48, is the best-selling act in Japan ever by number of singles sold – and third by total number of records sold – and has had as well the best-selling single in the country every year of the decade so far. Also, the best-selling album ever in the country, First Love, released in 1999, is by a woman, Japanese American singer and songwriter Hikaru Utada. South Korean idol girl groups have also been very successful the 2010s, with Twice having the best-performing single of 2016 in the country, as well as having won a total of 43 awards since their debut in October 2015. Another highly successful Korean idol girl group this decade is Blackpink, reaching the highest place ever for a K-pop girl group on the Billboard Hot 100 as well as being the first K-pop girl group to be number-one on the Billboard Emerging Artists chart.Citation error. See inline comment how to fix.  They have also won a total of 16 awards since their debut in August 2016. K-pop has become increasingly popular in the US with many idol girl groups climbing their way up the leaderboards. However, most of the popularity is going towards male groups[3], with females still overshadowed by the concept of a boys only club.[4] Chinese idol girl groups have also recently achieved significant success, with C-pop groups like SNH48 and Rocket Girls 101, with the later selling over 1.6 million copies of their debut EP in 2018.

Blues

Classic female blues was an early form of blues music popular in the 1920s. An amalgam of traditional folk blues and urban theater music, the style is also known as vaudeville blues.  Classic blues songs performed by female vocalists were accompanied by pianists or small jazz ensembles, and were the first blues to be recorded. The classic female blues singers were pioneers in the record industry, as they were among the first black singers and blues artists who were recorded. They were also instrumental in popularizing the 12-bar blues throughout the US.

Gertrude "Ma" Rainey (1886–1939), known as the "Mother of the Blues", is credited as the first to perform the blues on stage as popular entertainment when she began incorporating blues into her act of show songs and comedy around 1902.Harrison, Daphne Duval. Black Pearls: Blues Queens of the '20s. New Brunswick: Rutgers University Press, 1988. p. 34 New York-based cabaret singer Mamie Smith recorded "Crazy Blues" in 1920, which sold over 75,000 copies. Smith became known as "America's First Lady of the Blues". In 1920, the vaudeville singer Lucille Hegamin became the second black woman to record blues when she recorded "The Jazz Me Blues". Ethel Waters, Alberta Hunter, Mary Stafford, Katie Crippen, Edith Wilson, and Esther Bigeou, among others, made their first recordings before the end of 1921. These blues recordings were typically labeled as "race records" to distinguish them from records sold to white audiences. Nonetheless, the recordings of some of the classic female blues singers were purchased by white buyers as well. Marion Harris became one of the first white female singers to record the blues.

The most popular of the classic blues singers was Tennessee-born Bessie Smith (no relation to Mamie Smith), who first recorded in 1923 and became known as the "Empress of the Blues". She signed with Columbia and became the highest-paid black artist of the 1920s, recording over 160 songs. Other classic blues singers who recorded extensively until the end of the 1920s were Ida Cox, Clara Smith, and Sara Martin. These early blues singers were an influence on later singers such as Mahalia Jackson and Janis Joplin. These blues women's contributions to the genre included "increased improvisation on melodic lines, unusual phrasing which altered the emphasis and impact of the lyrics, and vocal dramatics using shouts, groans, moans, and wails. The blues women thus effected changes in other types of popular singing that had spin-offs in jazz, Broadway musicals, torch songs of the 1930s and 1940s, gospel, rhythm and blues, and eventually rock and roll."

Country music 
Gender discrimination and sexism occurs frequently in country music. In more recent times, a popular subgenre has developed: "Bro-Country", which has lyrics that sexually objectify women and frame them as assets for men's use. Some popular "Bro-Country" artists include Luke Bryan, Florida Georgia Line, and Blake Shelton. Gender discrimination and sexism has become more prominent in this genre over time, going backwards compared to some categories like rap and pop. Dr. Eric Rasmussen, a professor in the College of Media and Communication and Texas Tech University, argues that compared to the 1990s and 2000s (decade), the country music of the 2010s discriminates more against women. Some of the ways they discriminate include, "talking more about women's appearance, [showing] women in tight or revealing clothing, comparing women to objects, referring to women in slang [terms] versus their real names, and portraying women as distrustful and cheaters."

"Bro-Country" may be influenced by historical aspects of Southern culture which have been associated with racism and sexism. Women in country music continue to face these issues, and often find no way to directly deal with them. Kacey Musgraves, a recording artist, describes her experience with sexism in country music by stating that if a label can't get your song off the ground, it's immediately blamed on your personality or the fact that you're female, or that you didn't make a radio station program director feel important. Women like Kacey Musgraves, no matter what they do or change, will almost always fall under some form of scrutiny from her male competitors.

A large number of women singers in the country music genre have been influential to the industry through their success. Despite the popularity of male country artists and the discrimination that is displayed throughout their music, many female artists have worked their way past, leading them to achieve multiple accomplishments.

Dolly Parton, a female country singer that has been in the industry for over 55 years, developed a successful career for herself. Parton consistently created new projects to release to her fans and was described as "unstoppable" by a pop culture magazine titled Rolling Stone. These projects include over 45 musical albums, multiple film features, a Dollywood theme park, and the creation of a production company.

Carrie Underwood, the iconic American Idol winner, also created a lasting impact in the country music genre. With over 251,000 units sold, Underwood's album Cry Pretty was her fourth album to reach number one on the Billboard 200 list. Blown Away, Play On and Carnival Ride were the other three albums that also reached the top of the charts. These achievements led her to become the first women singer to have four country albums as number one in the all-genre Billboard 200. Underwood had multiple other number ones throughout her career, surpassing many other popular artists, as she left a strong impact on the female country music industry.

A women's rights activist and animal lover, Miranda Lambert, is another woman known to have a dominating career within the music industry. Her songs titled "Over You" and "Heart Like Mine" took over the Billboard charts and country music radio stations in 2010 and 2011. As a solo female artist, she writes her music through honesty and reality. The messages sent through her music are intended to help other women not to feel alone as they go through difficult life situations. Lambert uses the fame she has earned from the music industry and works with charities like the Humane Society as a way to give back.

Jazz

While women have been underrepresented in jazz as instrumentalists, composers, songwriters and bandleaders, there have been many female singers. Bessie Smith sang both the blues and jazz. Lena Horne first appeared in the Cotton Club as a teenager. Ella Fitzgerald and Billie Holiday were known for their ballads during the swing era. Shirley Horn sang both jazz and blues. Nina Simone sang jazz, folk and Rhythm and blues. Etta Jones sang rhythm and blues and jazz. Anita O'Day is known for her contributions to Bebop. Betty Carter sang during the post-bop era. Mary Lou Williams was a singer and pianist during the swing and hard bop eras. Sarah Vaughan is known for her singing in the Cool jazz era. Other singers include Rosemary Clooney, Diane Schuur and Flora Purim. Contemporary jazz singers include Norah Jones, Diana Krall, Melody Gardot and singer-bassist Esperanza Spalding. Esperanza Spalding has been trying to speak out louder and push towards more conversation about the current discrimination in jazz. In 2017, Esperanza Spalding spent 77 hours straight creating an entire album titled Exposure to help change herself. It quickly became "a display of dauntless prowess and grand ambition[1]" and showed, to thousands of people[1], a woman working confidently within the male dominated space of a recording studio.

Classical music

Classical singers typically do both live performances and recordings. Live performances may be in small venues, such as churches, or large venues, such as opera halls or arts centers. Classical singers may specialize in specific types of singing, such as art song, which are songs performed with piano accompaniment, or opera, which is singing accompanied by a symphony orchestra in a staged, costumed theatrical production.  Classical singers are typically categorized by their voice type, which indicates both their vocal range and in some cases also the "color" of their voice. Examples of voice types that indicate the range of a singer's voice include contralto, mezzo-soprano and soprano (these go from the lowest range to the highest range). Examples of voice types that indicate both the singer's range and the "color" of her voice type are coloratura soprano and lyric soprano. Whereas popular music singers typically use a microphone and a sound reinforcement system for their vocals, in classical music the voice must be projected into the hall naturally, a skill for which they undertake vocal training.

Black women

Marian Anderson (1897–1993) was an African-American contralto of whom music critic Alan Blyth said: "Her voice was a rich, vibrant contralto of intrinsic beauty." Most of her singing career was spent performing in concert and recital in major music venues and with famous orchestras throughout the United States and Europe between 1925 and 1965. Anderson became an important figure in the struggle for black artists to overcome racial prejudice in the United States during the mid-twentieth century. In 1939, the Daughters of the American Revolution (DAR) refused permission for Anderson to sing to an integrated audience in Constitution Hall. With the aid of First Lady Eleanor Roosevelt and her husband Franklin D. Roosevelt, Anderson performed a critically acclaimed open-air concert on Easter Sunday, 9 April 1939, on the steps of the Lincoln Memorial in Washington, D.C. She sang before a crowd of more than 75,000 people and a radio audience in the millions. Anderson continued to break barriers for black artists in the United States, becoming the first black person, American or otherwise, to perform at the Metropolitan Opera in New York City on 7 January 1955.

Classical singers
A short list of classical singers includes:
Elly Ameling
Cecilia Bartoli
Kathleen Battle
Maria Callas
Natalie Dessay
Joyce DiDonato
Frederica von Stade
Renée Fleming
Elina Garanca
Susan Graham
Anna Netrebko
Jessye Norman

 Sexism and discrimination of female musicians 
Whether it is hip-hop, country, or popular music, female musicians and performers from all genres experience discrimination and sexist treatment. The treatment of women in the music industry is best highlighted by the phrase denoted by Megan Jordan, heavily agreed upon in current scholarly discourse: 10X THE TALENT = 1/3 OF THE CREDIT. The three prominent forms of subtle discrimination experienced by female singers are being mistaken for non-musicians, lack of artistic control compared to their male counterparts, and having their sexuality, age, and femininity constantly scrutinized. In many cases, female musicians are dismissed into inferior roles, such as a "gimmick," "good for a girl," and "invisible accessory." Males lead most of the music projects and female musicians' artistic freedom is constrained by male bandleaders or managers. Another prevalent form of discrimination towards female vocalists and musicians in the music industry is sexual misconduct. Many female musicians are afraid to come out about their experiences with sexual assault because their stories are dismissed as being overly sensitive to what is just "normal" in the music industry. In the turn of twentieth century, however, many female vocalists such as Kesha, Taylor Swift, and Lady Gaga and Dua Lipa came forward with their stories, helping shape the anti-harassment movement. Additionally, under the Me Too movement, more stories of misconduct and discrimination in the music industry are being re-examined. Being one example out of many, Dua Lipa has spoken out about sexism in the music industry, claiming that "women struggle to get recognition," as often the success of big female artists is discredited by a "man behind the woman".

Another form of sexism in the music industry emanates from the lyrics prevalent in the music . There are five major themes in lyrics from all genres that facilitate female discrimination, noted here by Dr. Sarah Neff: "portrayal of women in traditional gender roles, portrayal of women as inferior to men, portrayal of women as objects, portrayal of women as stereotypes, and portrayal of violence against women." Utilizing a series of sexist markers, studies have found that countless lyrics entails sexist themes, including "depicting women in traditional gender roles, describing relationships with women in unrealistic ways, and attributing a woman's worth strictly on the basis of her physical appearance." Sexism in music is well-documented for genres such as rap and hip-hop, but with newer research, this holds true for country music, rock, and other genres as well.

World music

Women play an important role in world music, a musical category encompassing many different styles of music from around the world, including ethnic music and traditional music from Africa, the Caribbean, South America, Asia, and other regions, indigenous music, neotraditional music, and music where more than one cultural tradition intermingle (e.g., mixtures of Western pop and ethnic music). The term was popularized in the 1980s as a marketing category for non-Western traditional music.

Brazilian actress, singer and dancer Carmen Miranda became known in the West as exotic supplement in Hollywood films in the 1930s, akin to dancer Josephine Baker before, and the voice of exotica Yma Sumac after her. In the 1960s Elis Regina was the most prominent female singer in the Bossa Nova of Brazilian music that influenced popular music around the world. In the 1960s and 1970s Argentinian folk singer Mercedes Sosa, South African Miriam Makeba or Greek Maria Farantouri were also recognized for their engagement against the oppressive political situation in their home states. Sosa singing "Gracias a la vida", Makeba's "Pata Pata", and Farantouri's collaboration with composer Mikis Theodorakis were musical icons of the struggle for human rights. The "Queen of Salsa" Celia Cruz immigrated from Cuba to the United States in 1966.

With the rising interest in the then so-called world music in the 1980s old recordings of long established artists were re-discovered for a global audience and distributed worldwide; well known in their home country –sometimes stars with legendary status– like Arabic singers Umm Kulthum, Asmahan, and Fairuz, the Algerian Raï singer Cheikha Rimitti, Asha Bhosle, most prolific playback singer for Bollywood film soundtracks, Romani Esma Redžepova, Mexican ranchera singer Chavela Vargas, and the Mahotella Queens from South Africa; or they were recorded for the first time (by Caucasian males) like Cesária Évora from Cape Verde, Stella Chiweshe from Zimbabwe and Afro-Peruvian Susana Baca.

There are many women world music performers, including: Ann Savoy, Bi Kidude, Brenda Fassie, Chabuca Granda, Chava Alberstein, Cleoma Breaux Falcon, Dolly Collins, Elizabeth Cotten, Frehel, Gal Costa, Genoa Keawe, Googoosh, Hazel Dickens, Jean Ritchie, Lata Mangeshkar, Leah Song, Lola Beltrán, Lucha Reyes, Lucilla Galeazzi (The Mammas), Lydia Mendoza, Maria Tanase, Mariam Doumbia, Nada Mamula, Ofra Haza, Oumou Sangare, Rita Marley, Rosa Passos, Roza Eskenazi, Safiye Ayla, Salamat Sadikova, Selda Bagcan, Shirley Collins, Valya Balkanska, Violeta Parra, Warda, Marta Gómez and Zap Mama.

Eastern music

Arabic music

Arabic music is an amalgam of the music of the Arab people in the Arabian Peninsula and the music of all the varied peoples that make up the Arab world. In Egypt during the medieval era, male professional musicians during this period were called Alateeyeh (plural), or Alatee (singular), which means "a player upon an instrument". However, this name applies to both vocalists as well as instrumentalists. Male professional musicians were considered disreputable and lowly, and they earned their living playing at parties. Female professional musicians in Egypt were called Awalim (pl) or Al'meh, which means a "learned female". These singers were often hired on the occasion of a celebration in the harem of a wealthy person. They were not with the harem, but in an elevated room that was concealed by a screen so as not to be seen by either the harem or the master of the house. The female Awalim were more highly paid than male performers and more highly regarded.

In the 9th century, using male instrumentalists was harshly criticized in a treatise, because male musicians were associated with perceived vices such as playing chess and writing love poetry. Following the invasion of Egypt, Napoleon commissioned reports on the state of Ottoman culture. The report reveals that there were guilds of male instrumentalists who played to male audiences, and "learned female" singer/musicians who sang and played for women audiences.

Chinese music

thumb|right|150px|Members of SNH48 performing. Left to right: He XiaoYu, Zeng Yanfen, Yi JiaAi (zh) and Li Yitong.
In Chinese music, music was a major activity for women during Ancient times, especially for learned women. Women performers were associated with the guqin since ancient times. The guqin is a plucked seven-string Chinese musical instrument of the zither family. It has traditionally been favored by scholars and literati as an instrument of great subtlety and refinement. A woman guqin player was Cai Wenji, associated with the piece Hujia Shiba-pai.

Women musicians also play a key role in Chinese folk music. In southern Fujian and Taiwan, Nanyin or Nanguan music is a genre of traditional Chinese folk ballads. It sung by a woman accompanied by a xiao flute and a pipa, as well as other traditional instruments. The music is sung by Minnan dialect. The music is generally sorrowful and typically deals with the topic of a love-stricken woman.

The Chinese pop (C-pop) music industry in the 1930s and 1940s was dominated by the Seven Great Singing Stars, who were the most renowned singers of China in the 1940s. Zhou Xuan, Gong Qiuxia, Yao Lee and Bai Hong emerged in the 1930s, while Bai Guang, Li Xianglan and Wu Yingyin became popular in the 1940s. After 1949, these early generations of C-pop were denounced by the Chinese Communist Party as Yellow Music as it saw pop music as sexually indecent (the color yellow is associated with eroticism and sex in China). Only after the end of the Cultural Revolution, by the early 1980s, could Yellow Music be performed again.

Nowadays, after China's extensive political and cultural changes of the past 50 years, Chinese popular music has been increasingly emulating and taking inspiration from the styles of popular music of South Korea (K-pop) and of Japan (J-pop), both of which it now closely resembles. As such, during the 2010s, several girl groups have been established based both on the Japanese model, like SNH48 (created in 2012) and its sister groups, as well as on the Korean model, like Rocket Girls, created in 2018 from the Chinese version of a Korean reality television talent competition show. These groups have achieved significant success, with the debut EP of Rocket Girls selling over 1.6 million copies. Despite this though, solo Chinese female artists continue to be much more popular overall in the country, as they have traditionally been. Some of the most recently popular solo Chinese female singers include Faye Wong, G.E.M. Gloria Tang, Lala Hsu, 胡66, Ada Zhuang, Kelly Yu, 陳粒 (zh), Feng Timo, Bibi Zhou, 双笙, Tia Ray, Vanessa Jin 金玟岐 (zh) and Jane Zhang.

Indian music

Indian classical music is the art music of the Indian subcontinent. The origins of Indian classical music can be found in the Hindu hymns. This chanting style evolved into jatis and eventually into ragas. Indian classical music has also been significantly influenced by, or syncretised with, Indian folk music. The major composers from the historical Indian classical music tradition were men. Modern women vocalists include D. K. Pattammal, M. S. Subbalakshmi, Gangubai Hangal, Hirabai Barodekar, Kesarbai Kerkar, Kishori Amonkar, Malini Rajurkar, Mogubai Kurdikar, Prabha Atre, Roshan Ara Begum and Shruti Sadolikar Katkar. One woman instrumentalist is Annapurna Devi.

In Indian folk music, lavani is a music genre popular in Maharashtra that is traditionally performed by women.
Bhangra (Punjabi: ਭੰਗੜਾ) is a form of dance-oriented folk music of Punjab. The present musical style is derived from non-traditional musical accompaniment to the riffs of Punjab called by the same name. The female dance of Punjab region is known as Giddha (Punjabi: ਗਿੱਧਾ).

In the music of Bollywood (the centre of India's film industry) and other regional film industries in India, women playback singers have had a significant role, with the sisters Lata Mangeshkar and Asha Bhosle, who have mainly worked in Hindi films, often referred to as two of the best-known and most prolific playback singers in India. In 2011, Bhosle was officially acknowledged by the Guinness Book of World Records as the most recorded artist in music history.

Iranian music

Since the Iranian revolution, Iranian female solo vocalists have been permitted to perform for female audiences. Female vocalists can perform for male audiences only as a part of a chorus. Traditionally, it has been difficult for female singers to appear publicly. Women were only allowed to perform for religious rituals, called Tazieh, and men were generally forbidden to listen to women. Before the Revolution, Iranian women could only sing in private, while working, for other women, or during women's celebrations. Qamar ol-Molouk Vaziri (1905–1959) is one of the first female masters of Persian music. Female musicians include Delkash (1923–2004); Simin Ghanem (born 1944); Maryam Akhondy (born 1957), founder of Barbad Ensemble; Persian classical guitarist Lily Afshar; singer Shakila, winner of Persian Academy Award; the conductor Soodabeh Salem; Afsaneh Rasaei; Pirayeh Pourafar, founder of Nava Ensemble and Lian Ensemble; and Mahsa Vahdat.

The classical singer Fatemeh Vaezi (commonly known by her stage name "Parisa") has given concerts accompanied by a female orchestra. After 1986 Maryam Akhondy started working with other Iranian musicians in exile. In 2000 Maryam Akhondy created the all-female a cappella group Banu which sung old folk songs that were part of women's activities and celebrations. Singer Sima Bina has taught many female students. Ghashang Kamkar teaches both male and female students. Both Ghashang and Vaezi have criticized the patriarchal power structure in Iran for its treatment of female musicians. Iranian folk-music performers include Sima Bina, Darya Dadvar, Monika Jalili, Ziba Shirazi, Zohreh Jooya, and Shushā Guppy. Iranian pop performers include Googoosh, Hayedeh, Mahasti, Leila Forouhar, Pooran, and Laleh Pourkarim. World music performers include Azam Ali and Cymin Samawatie.

Japanese music

Japan has the largest physical music market in the world, with US$2 billion in 2014 and the second largest overall music market, with a total retail value of 2.6 billion dollars in 2014. The physical singles market is dominated by Japanese idol women artists, with 9 out of the top 10 best-selling singles in the country in 2015 belonging to either the idol girl group AKB48 or its "sister" and "rival" groups. AKB48 has had the best-selling singles of the year in the country for the past six years and the group is also the best-selling act in Japan by number of singles sold. Japanese American singer and songwriter Hikaru Utada has the best-selling album in the country, First Love.

Jewish music
There is literary evidence from biblical books such as The Book of Judges that women (including Miriam, Deborah and Hannah), participated in musical traditions that included singing lamentations and playing instruments. However, women are not mentioned in references to liturgy. Women were eventually banned from liturgical worship (kolisha). Though they would continue to have a role in the musical rituals of the domestic sphere at home, burials and weddings, these customs were not documented as liturgical music (and its creators and performers) were.

Music scholars and educators

Musicologists and music historians

The vast majority of major musicologists and music historians have been men. Nevertheless, some women musicologists have reached the top ranks of the profession. Carolyn Abbate (born 1956) is an American musicologist who did her PhD at Princeton University. She has been described by the Harvard Gazette as "one of the world's most accomplished and admired music historians".

Susan McClary (born 1946) is a musicologist associated with the "New Musicology" who incorporates feminist music criticism in her work. McClary holds a PhD from Harvard University. One of her best known works is Feminine Endings (1991), which covers musical constructions of gender and sexuality, gendered aspects of traditional music theory, gendered sexuality in musical narrative, music as a gendered discourse and issues affecting women musicians. In the book, McClary suggests that the sonata form (used in symphonies and string quartets) may be a sexist or misogynistic procedure that constructs of gender and sexual identity. McClary's Conventional Wisdom (2000) argues that the traditional musicological assumption of the existence of "purely musical" elements, divorced from culture and meaning, the social and the body, is a conceit used to veil the social and political imperatives of the worldview that produces the classical canon most prized by supposedly objective musicologists.

Other women scholars include:

Eva Badura-Skoda
Margaret Bent
Suzanne Cusick
Ursula Günther
Maud Cuney Hare
Liudmila Kovnatskaya
Kendra Preston Leonard
Rosetta Reitz
Elaine Sisman
Hedi Stadlen
Rose Rosengard Subotnik 
Anahit Tsitsikian

Ethnomusicologists

Ethnomusicologists study the many musics around the world that emphasize their cultural, social, material, cognitive, biological, and other dimensions or contexts instead of or in addition to its isolated sound component or any particular repertoire.
Ethnomusicology – a term coined by Jaap Kunst from the Greek words ἔθνος (ethnos, "nation") and μουσική (mousike, "music") – is often described as the anthropology or ethnography of music. Initially, ethnomusicology was almost exclusively oriented toward non-Western music, but now includes the study of Western music from anthropological, sociological and intercultural perspectives.

Women have also made significant contributions in Ethnomusicology, especially in the intersection of gender studies and Ethnomusicology. Ellen Koskoff, professor emerita at the Eastman School of Music, has done extensive work on gender in Ethnomusicology. Koskoff has also served as president of the Society for Ethnomusicology and hosted a radio show called "What in the World is Music?"

In, “An Introduction to Women, Music, and Culture” (1987), Koskoff argues that music performed by women is “devalued” and in some cases, is even considered, “non-music,” despite having “musical form”. Koskoff explains that the distinction that men occupy public spheres and women occupy private, domestic ones has, “creat[ed] not necessarily two separate and self-contained music cultures, but rather two differentiated yet complementary halves of culture. She reasons that because “In most societies, a woman’s identity is believed to be embedded in her sexuality,” “one of the most common associations between women and music... links women’s primary sexual identity and role with music performance”. Based on this association, Koskoff argues that “Four categories of music performance thus emerge in connection with inter-gender relations: (1) performance that confirms and maintains the established social/sexual arrangement; (2) performance that appears to maintain the established norms in order to protect other, more relevant values; (3) performance that protests, yet maintains, the order (often through symbolic behavior); and (4) performance that challenges and threatens established order”.

Deborah Wong, a professor at the University of California, Riverside. is known for her focus on the music of southeast Asia, Asian American music making, and has also studied Taiko, or Japanese American drumming.

Other women ethnomusicologists include:

Judith Becker
Frances Densmore
Ida Halpern
Maud Karpeles
Janet E Tobitt
Deborah Wong
Katherine Hagedorn

Music educators

While music critics argued in the 1880s that "women lacked the innate creativity to compose good music" due to "biological predisposition", later, it was accepted that women would have a role in music education, and they became involved in this field "to such a degree that women dominated music education during the latter half of the 19th century and well into the 20th century." "Traditional accounts of the history of music education [in the US] have often neglected the contributions of women, because these texts have emphasized bands and the top leaders in hierarchical music organizations." When looking beyond these bandleaders and top leaders, women had many music education roles in the "home, community, churches, public schools, and teacher-training institutions" and "as writers, patrons, and through their volunteer work in organizations."

Despite the limitations imposed on women's roles in music education in the 19th century, women were accepted as kindergarten teachers, because this was deemed to be a "private sphere". Women also taught music privately, in girl's schools, Sunday schools, and they trained musicians in school music programs. By the turn of the 20th century, women began to be employed as music supervisors in elementary schools, teachers in normal schools and professors of music in universities. Women also became more active in professional organizations in music education, and women presented papers at conferences.

A woman, Frances Clarke (1860–1958) founded the Music Supervisors National Conference in 1907. While a small number of women served as president of the Music Supervisors National Conference (and the following renamed versions of the organization over the next century) in the early 20th century, there were only two female presidents between 1952 and 1992, which "[p]ossibly reflects discrimination." After 1990, however, leadership roles for women in the organization opened up. From 1990 to 2010, there were five female presidents of this organization. Women music educators "outnumber men two-to-one" in teaching general music, choir, private lessons, and keyboard instruction . More men tend to be hired as for band education, administration and jazz jobs, and more men work in colleges and universities. According to Dr. Sandra Wieland Howe, there is still a "glass ceiling" for women in music education careers, as there is "stigma" associated with women in leadership positions and "men outnumber women as administrators."

Individuals
Julia Crane (1855–1923) was an American music educator who set up a school, the Crane School of Music in Potsdam, New York, which was the first school specifically for the training of public school music teachers. She is among the most important figures in the history of American music education. Crane was a student of Manuel García. Crane was inducted into the Music Educators Hall of Fame in 1986. As of 2015, the Crane School of Music is one of three schools which make up the State University of New York (SUNY) at Potsdam. It has 630 undergraduate and 30 graduate students and a faculty of 70 teachers and professional staff.
 (1900–1997), musician, musicologist, pianist and organist, studied musicology in Breslau, Munich, Jena and Freiburg in Breisgau, where she made her doctorate in musicology in 1928, her supervisor was Wilibald Gurlitt. According to Texas State University professor Nico Schüler she was the first woman to graduate with a doctorate in musicology. In 1930 she founded with Peter Harlan and her husband, the composer Hanning Schröder, the Harlan Trio for historically informed performances, path-breaking for this new genre, based also on her research in clavichord music and compositions. With the Nazi takeover of the German government and its anti-Semitic discriminations the non-observant Protestant Schröder-Auerbach was banned in 1934 from publicly performing because her four grandparents had been Jewish. From early 1944 on, under veiled so-called Aryan identity she restarted public music performances in Dargun as the church organist, choirmaster and music teacher, after 1945 she continued this and also networked in the music chapter of the Mecklenburg state association of the Cultural Association of the GDR. In 1952 she joined the East German Academy of Arts in East Berlin, where she rebuilt the music archive, lost in 1945 with the destruction of the predecessor Prussian Academy of Arts. Living in the American Sector of Berlin the East Berlin Academy dismissed her in 1959. She also worked as author, lexicographer, music critic for the Berliner Börsen-Courier, radio stations and the Deutsche Grammophon.
Carolynn Lindeman (born 1940) graduated from Oberlin College Conservatory of Music, the Mozarteum Academy, San Francisco State University and Stanford University, where she received her Doctor of Musical Arts. She was a professor at San Francisco State University from 1973 to 2005. She was president of the Music Educators National Conference from 1996 to 1998. She edited the "Strategies for Teaching" series. She "[a]cknowledge[d gender] discrimination in academia."
June Hinckley (1943–2007) graduated with a PhD from Florida State University. She was a music and fine arts supervisor in Brevard County in Florida. She wrote articles on music education. She was president of the Music Educators National Conference from 1998 to 2000.
Lynn Brinckmeyer received her PhD from the University of Kansas. She was an associate professor and director of choral music education at Texas State University. She was president of the Music Educators National Conference from 2006 to 2008.
Barbara Geer graduated from the University of North Carolina. She was a music consultant for a school system in North Carolina and she served as president of the Music Educators National Conference from 2008 to 2010.
Grace Harriet Spofford (1887–1974) was an American music educator and administrator. She graduated from Smith College in 1909, and later from the Peabody Conservatory of Music with degrees in piano (1913) and organ (1916). Her first position in education was directly after her time at Smith, teaching piano at Heidelberg College (now Heidelberg University). After attending Peabody, Spofford became a piano teacher and later an administrator there. From 1924 to 1931, she was the first dean of the Curtis Institute of Music in Philadelphia. From 1935 to 1954, she was the director of the Henry Street Settlement's music school. She was largely responsible for commissioning The Second Hurricane, a play-opera by Aaron Copland and Edwin Denby. After retirement, Spofford was involved with international music relations. Between 1954 and 1963, she served as chairman of music of the International Council of Women three times, during which the council sponsored the recording of orchestral works by five women composers: Mabel Wheeler Daniels, Miriam Gideon, Mary Howe, Julia Perry, and Louise Talma. In 1964 and 1966, Spofford was a delegate to the International Music Council. She received a 1968 honor from the National Federation of Music Clubs for "distinguished service to music in the field of human rights."
Sharon Isbin, founding director of the guitar department at the Juilliard School and multiple Grammy Award-winning classical guitarist. In 1989, she created the Master of Music degree, Graduate Diploma and Artist Diploma for classical guitar at the Juilliard School, making history by becoming their first guitar faculty and the founding director of the guitar department; she added the Bachelor of Music degree and Undergraduate Diploma to the program in 2007, and the Doctor of Musical Arts in 2018. Isbin has appeared as soloist with over 200 orchestras, and has commissioned more concertos than any other guitarist. She is the author of the Classical Guitar Answer Book and the director of the Guitar Department at the Aspen Music Festival.

Conducting
 

The majority of professional orchestra conductors are male; The Guardian called conducting "one of the last glass ceilings in the music industry". A 2013 article stated that in France, out of 574 concerts only 17 were conducted by women and no women conducted at the National Opéra in Paris. Bachtrack reported that, in a list of the world's 150 top conductors that year, only five were women. A small number of female conductors have become top-ranked international conductors. In January 2005, Australian conductor Simone Young became the first woman to conduct the Vienna Philharmonic. In 2008 Marin Alsop, a protégé of Leonard Bernstein, became the first woman to become the music director and principal conductor of a major US orchestra when she won the top job at the Baltimore Symphony. There were "protests from a large swathe of the Baltimore Symphony when she was first named Music Director", but since that time, "plaudits [have] roll[ed] in." In 2014, Alsop was the first woman conductor to lead the Last Night of the Proms concert–one of the most important classical music events in Britain–in its 118-year history.

While there is a lack of women in professional orchestra, more recent studies show that the conducting profession itself lacks gender and racial diversity. There is a clear distinction between the low number of white women in the field compared to that of white men, but there is an even lower number of other racial and ethnic identities. The proportion of non-white musicians represented in the orchestra workforce – and of African American and Hispanic / Latino musicians in particular –remains extremely low. The field of orchestra continues to remain predominantly white. Positions such as conductors, executives, and staff are dominated by white individuals, in particular, white males. In high level executive positions, it remains rare to see women or people of color. However, the gender gap narrowed in the early 1990s, with women musicians making up between 46% and 49% of the total musician pool in the two decades since. The years 1980 to 2014 saw a four-fold increase in the proportion of diverse musicians on stage, driven largely by an increase in musicians from Asian / Pacific Islander backgrounds. Over the years, more attention was brought to gender and racial disparity in the field. This awareness has caused positive impacts in the orchestrating field. Data about conductors from 2006 to 2016 reveals there is a gradual but steady trend towards greater racial and ethnic diversity, with the percentage of African American, Latino / Hispanic, Asian /Pacific Islander, American Indian / Alaskan Native, and other non-white conductorsincreasing from 15.7% in 2006 to 21% in 2016. Although there has been reconstruction of the whiteness and gender domination of males in the field, there is still work to be done.

Many women within the orchestrating profession experience forms of discrimination whether it be gender, racial, or both. Women, initially, were not encouraged to play professionally because it was deemed inappropriate by society. Women were further considered neither strong enough nor skilled enough to play instruments other than the piano, or to survive grueling rehearsal schedules. Jeri Lynne Johnson was the first African-American woman to win an international conducting prize when she was awarded the Taki Concordia conducting fellowship in 2005. She is the founder and music director of the Black Pearl Chamber Orchestra, the first multi-ethnic professional orchestra in Philadelphia. A graduate of Wellesley College and the University of Chicago, she is a conductor, composer and pianist. From 2001 to 2004, she was the assistant conductor of The Chamber Orchestra of Philadelphia. She has led orchestras around the world including the Colorado Symphony, Bournemouth Symphony (UK), and the Weimar Staatskapelle (Germany). Alongside prominent woman conductors Marin Alsop and JoAnn Falletta, Ms. Johnson was heralded on the NBC Today Show as one of the nation's leading female conductors.

According to the UK's Radio 3 editor, Edwina Wolstencroft, "The music world has been happy to have female performers ...for a long time...[;]But owning authority and power in public is another matter. That's where female conductors have had a hard time. Our society is more resistant to women being powerful in public than to women being entertaining." The low percentage of women conductors is not because women do not study in music school; indeed, in 2009 and 2012 almost half of the recipients of conducting doctorates were women.

The turn for women's rights in music began the feminist movement in America in 1848. The movement fueled  all women to fight for equal rights in a plethora of fields such as voting, education, employment, and marriage. While the women's rights movement meant the start of including women into the orchestrating field, there would still be barriers that these women needed to overcome. Women of color, in particular, were faced with many stereotypes that challenged the worthiness of their work. In fact, black women's work in the field faced more scrutiny than their white counterparts. A classic example of this is seen in a study conducted for the Bulletin of the Council for Research in Music Education, by Elliot Charles, in 1996. Elliot Examined:

Whether race and gender influenced judgments of musical performances. Four trumpeters and four flutists were videotaped performing the same music excerpt. For each instrument, one white male, one white female, one black male, and one black female, served as models. To control the audio portion of the study, the researcher used two prerecorded performances, one for the trumpets and one for the flutes. This created the same audio for all trumpets and flute performances. College music majors rated each performance on a Likert-type scale. Results revealed black performers of each genders and instruments were rated significantly lower than white performers. The lowest ratings were given to black male and female trumpet players.

This example demonstrates that gender discrimination was prevalent during this time, but racial discrimination must be accounted for as well.

Sexism, Racism, and Gender Discrimination
Women conductors faced sexism, racism, and gender discrimination throughout the 19th century and 20th century. "To break down this apparent employment barrier, women created their own opportunities by founding and organizing all-female orchestras"; one example is the Fadette Women's Orchestra in Boston founded in 1888 by conductor Caroline B. Nichols. A number of other all-women orchestras were founded in the early decades of the 20th century, and women conductors led these groups. It is both interesting and ironic that something that is considered "universal"  has historically excluded women (with the exception of certain stereotypically defined roles) and more specifically women on color. This comments on the fact that the underrepresentation of women in conducting is seen as a sexism issue, but also an issue of racism as well.

Women conductors continue to face sexism in the early decades of the 21st century. In the 2010s, several male conductors and musicians made sexist statements about women conductors. In 2013, "Vasily Petrenko, the principal conductor of the Oslo Philharmonic and the Royal Liverpool Philharmonic, provoked outrage when he told a Norwegian newspaper that 'orchestras react better when they have a man in front of them." He also stated that "when women have families, it becomes difficult to be as dedicated as is demanded in the business". Bruno Mantovani, the director of the Paris Conservatoire, gave an interview in which he made sexist statements about women conductors. Mantovani raised the "problem of maternity" and he questioned the ability of women to withstand the physical challenges and stresses of the profession, which he claimed involve "conducting, taking a plane, taking another plane, conducting again." Yuri Temirkanov, the music director of the St. Petersburg Philharmonic, made sexist statements about women conductors in a September 2013 interview, stating that "The essence of the conductor's profession is strength. The essence of a woman is weakness." Finnish conductor Jorma Panula made sexist statements about women conductors in 2014; he stated that "women [conductors are not]... getting any better – only worse", which he called a "purely biological question."

Conductors
Female conductors include:
Marin Alsop (*1956)
Jessica Bejarano (*1981)
Frieda Belinfante (1904–1995)
Gisele Ben-Dor (*1955)
Nadia Boulanger (1887–1979)
Antonia Brico (1902–1989)
Sylvia Caduff (*1937)
Joana Carneiro (*1976)
Sian Edwards (*1959)
JoAnn Faletta (*1954)
Jane Glover (*1949)
Mirga Gražinytė-Tyla (*1986)
Julia Jones (*1961)
Karen Kamensek (*1970)
Natalia Luis-Bassa (*1966)
Alondra de la Parra (*1980) 
Kristiina Poska (*1978)
Lidiya Yankovskaya (*1986)
Simone Young (*1961)
Xian Zhang (*1973)

Music critics

Popular music

According to Anwen Crawford, the "problem for women [popular music critics] is that our role in popular music was codified long ago", which means that "[b]ooks by living female rock critics (or jazz, hip-hop, and dance-music critics, for that matter) are scant". Crawford notes that the "most famous rock-music critics—Robert Christgau, Greil Marcus, Lester Bangs, Nick Kent—are all male".

Sociomusicologist Simon Frith noted that pop and rock music "are closely associated with gender; that is, with conventions of male and female behaviour". According to Holly Kruse, both popular music articles and academic articles about pop music are usually written from "masculine subject positions". As well, there are relatively few women writing in music journalism: "By 1999, the number of female editors or senior writers at Rolling Stone hovered around...15%, [while] at Spin and Raygun, [it was] roughly 20%." Criticism associated with gender was discussed in a 2014 Jezebel article about the struggles of women in music journalism, written by music critic Tracy Moore, previously an editor at the Nashville Scene.

The American music critic Ann Powers, as a female critic and journalist for a popular, male-dominated industry, has written critiques the perceptions of sex, racial and social minorities in the music industry. She has also written about feminism. In 2006 she accepted a position as chief pop-music critic at the Los Angeles Times, where she succeeded Robert Hilburn. In 2005, Powers co-wrote the book Piece by Piece with musician Tori Amos, which discusses the role of women in the modern music industry, and features information about composing, touring, performance, and the realities of the music business.

Anwen Crawford, a writer for The Monthly contributed to Jessica Hopper's book of essays and profiles entitled The First Collection of Criticism by a Living Female Rock Critic. Crawford's article "explores women's long struggle for visibility and recognition in the field of rock criticism, even though we've been helping to pioneer it from the start". Crawford states that "[t]he record store, the guitar shop, and now social media: when it comes to popular music, these places become stages for the display of male prowess"; "[f]emale expertise, when it appears, is repeatedly dismissed as fraudulent. Every woman who has ever ventured an opinion on popular music could give you some variation [of this experience]... and becoming a recognized "expert" (a musician, a critic) will not save [women] from accusations of fakery."

Popular music critics include:
Tanja Bakić
Raquel Cepeda
Ann Powers
Joy Press
Lillian Roxon
Linda Solomon
Penny Valentine
Ellen Willis, Out of the Vinyl Deeps (2011)

Classical music

"The National Arts Journalism Program (NAJP) at Columbia... completed a large study of arts journalism in America [in 2005]. They found that 'the average classical music critic is a white, 52-year-old male with a graduate degree, but twenty-six percent of all critics writing are female.'" However, William Osborne points out that this 26% figure includes all newspapers, including low-circulation regional papers. Osborne states that the "large US papers, which are the ones that influence public opinion, have virtually no women classical music critics." The only female critics from major US papers are Anne Midgette (New York Times) and Wynne Delacoma (Chicago Sun-Times). Midgette was the "first woman to cover classical music in the entire history of the paper." Susannah Clapp, a critic from The Guardian–a newspaper that has a female classical music critic–stated in May 2014 that she had only then realized "what a rarity" a female classical music critic is in journalism.

Women classical music critics include:
Anne Midgette (New York Times)
Marion Lignana Rosenberg (1961–2013)

Other musical professions

Record producing and sound engineering
A 2013 Sound on Sound article stated that there are "few women in record production and sound engineering." Ncube states that "[n]inety-five percent of music producers are male, and although there are female producers achieving great things in music, they are less well-known than their male counterparts." "Only three women have ever been nominated for best producer at the Brits or the Grammys" and none won either award. "Women who want to enter the [producing] field face a boys' club, or a guild mentality".

Despite this, women haven been taking on the challenge since the 1940s. Mary Shipman Howard was an engineer in New York City in the 1940s. Lillian McMurry was a record producer and founder of Trumpet Records in the 1950s. One of the first women to produce, engineer, arrange and promote music on her own rock and roll music label was Cordell Jackson (1923–2004). She founded the Moon Records label in Memphis in 1956 and began releasing and promoting on the label singles she recorded in her home studio, serving as engineer, producer and arranger. Ethel Gabriel had a 40-year career with RCA and was the first major label record producer.

Trina Shoemaker is a mixer, record producer and sound engineer responsible for producing/engineering and/or mixing records for bands such as Queens of the Stone Age, Sheryl Crow, Emmylou Harris, Something for Kate, Nanci Griffith and many more. In 1998 Shoemaker became the first woman to win the Grammy Award for Best Engineered Album for her work on The Globe Sessions. In addition to Crow, Shoemaker went on to work with artists such as Blues Traveller, Emmylou Harris, the Indigo Girls and the Dixie Chicks.

Other women include:

Leslie Ann Jones, engineer at Skywalker Sound
Sylvia Massy, producer, engineer and mixer
Emily Lazar, mastering engineer
Susan Rogers, engineer for Purple RainGenya Ravan, producer of The Dead Boys' Young, Loud and SnottySylvia Robinson, early hip hop music producer
Judith Sherman, producer and engineer of classical and new music
Lari White, co-producer on Toby Keith's White Trash With MoneyDJs and turntablists 

Women in music are often seen mainly in singing roles in popular music and there are relatively few women DJs or turntablists in hip hop music, house music, nu metal and other genres where DJs and turntablists participate. Indeed, all of these genres are very male-dominated. Part of this may stem from a general low percentage of women in audio technology-related jobs, such as audio engineering and production.  In 2007 Mark Katz's article "Men, Women, and Turntables: Gender and the DJ Battle," stated that "very few women battle; the matter has been a topic of conversation among hip-hop DJs for years." In 2010 Rebekah Farrugia states "the male-centricity of EDM culture" contributes to "a marginalisation of women in these [EDM] spaces." While turntablism and broader DJ practices should not be conflated, Katz suggests use or lack of use of the turntable broadly by women across genres and disciplines is impacted upon by what he defines as "male technophilia." Historian Ruth Oldenziel concurs in her writing on engineering with this idea of socialization as a central factor in the lack of engagement with technology. She explains: "an exclusive focus on women's supposed failure to enter the field ... is insufficient for understanding how our stereotypical notions have come into being; it tends to put the burden of proof entirely on women and to blame them for their supposedly inadequate socialization, their lack of aspiration, and their want of masculine values. An equally challenging question is why and how boys have come to love things technical, how boys have historically been socialized as technophiles."

Lucy Green has focused on gender in relation to musical performers and creators, and specifically on educational frameworks as they relate to both. She suggests that women's alienation from "areas that have a strong technological tendency such as DJing, sound engineering and producing" are "not necessarily about her dislike of these instruments but relates to the interrupting effect of their dominantly masculine delineations." Despite this, women and girls do increasingly engage in turntable and DJ practices, individually and collectively, and "carve out spaces for themselves in EDM and DJ Culture". There are various projects dedicated to the promotion and support of these practices such as Female DJs London. Some artists and collectives go beyond these practices to be more gender inclusive. For example, Discwoman, a New York-based collective and booking agency, describe themselves as "representing and showcasing cis women, trans women and genderqueer talent."

Movements, organizations, events and genres
Women's music

Women's music (also womyn's music or wimmin's music) is music by women, for women, and about women. The genre emerged as a musical expression of the second-wave feminist movement as well as the labor, civil rights, and peace movements. The movement (in the US) was started by lesbians such as Cris Williamson, Meg Christian and Margie Adam, African-American musicians (including Linda Tillery, Mary Watkins, Gwen Avery) and activists such as Bernice Johnson Reagon and her group Sweet Honey in the Rock, and peace activist Holly Near. Women's music also refers to the wider industry of women's music that goes beyond the performing artists to include studio musicians, producers, sound engineers, technicians, cover artists, distributors, promoters, and festival organizers who are also women.

Organizations

International Alliance for Women in Music
The International Alliance for Women in Music (IAWM) is an international organization of women and men dedicated to fostering and encouraging the activities of women in music, particularly in the areas of musical activity, such as composing, performing, and research, in which gender discrimination is an historic and ongoing concern. The IAWM engages in efforts to increase the programming of music by female composers, to combat discrimination against female musicians, including as symphony orchestra members, and to include accounts of the contributions of women musicians in university music curricula. To end gender discrimination, the IAWM led successful boycotts of the American concerts of the Vienna Philharmonic Orchestra in the 1990s; the "VPO watch" continues. Advocacy by the organization has contributed to the inclusion of women composers in college music history textbooks.

Women in Music (WIM-NY)
Women in Music (WIM-NY) is an American organization based in New York City which was founded in 1985. It aims to "support, cultivate and recognize the talents of women" in music. WIM-NY holds activities and events, including "seminars, panels, and networking events." As well, it gives out annual Touchstone Awards to women in music. WIM-NY members include "record label executives, artist managers, songwriters, musicians, attorneys, recording engineers, agents, publicists, studio owners, music publishers, online and traditional marketers" from "all genres of music and all areas of the [music] industry." As of 2015, the president is lawyer Neeta Ragoowansi and the vice-president is lawyer Jennifer Newman Sharpe. As of 2015, the board of directors includes women from Nielsen Music, Warner Music Group, Ableton, Downtown Music Publishing and the Berklee College of Music.

Women in Music Canada 
Women in Music Canada Professional Association (WIMC) is an organization based in Toronto, Ontario, that was established in 2012. It is a federally registered non-profit organization that aims to "foste[r] equality in the music industry through the support and advancement of women." WIMC is financially supported by the federal government, the FACTOR program, the Ontario government and Slaight Music.

Women in Music (WIM-UK)
Women in Music (WIM-UK) is a United Kingdom "membership organization that celebrates women's music making across all genres of music." WIM-UK works to raise "awareness of gender issues in music and support women musicians in their professional development." WIM-UK's website provides information on competitions and job opportunities. WIM-UK does a survey of the numbers of women composers, conductors and soloists who appear in the BBC PROMS, the "largest classical music festival in the world." For the 2015 Proms, women composers made up 10% of the program, women conductors made up 4% of the 50 conductors and female instrumental soloists made up 30%.

Now Girls Rule (Mexico)

Now Girls Rule is a feminist organization in Mexico, created for the empowerment and promotion of women artists, and women fronted acts and bands, that celebrates music created by women, as well generating spaces, and expanding the art scene in Mexico by focusing on the creation of new generations of artists through education and inspiration. Now Girls Rule was founded, by independent Mexican Rock musician Elis Paprika in 2014, drawing the name from her single "Now Girls Rule", released that year, where Elis featured other important Latin American women artists, Sandrushka Petrova and Ana Cristina Mo from the band Descartes a Kant, Renee Mooi, and Vanessa Zamora. Throughout her career, Elis Paprika has been constantly bringing attention to the fact that, despite the enormous number of talented women artists, the Mexican music scene has historically failed in the promotion and creation of appropriate spaces and opportunities for women in music.

Now Girls Rule features annual events like: Girl Camps that feature music, and fanzine design lessons for young girls ages 7–17, where every teacher is an established woman artist from Mexico's scene. Now Girls Rule created this format in order for young aspiring artists to directly meet and learn from women who have pursued their dreams, and worked to make a living off of their art, soy they can be inspired to develop a career in music and art. Now Girls Rule Nights, a series of live concerts that feature established women artists and women fronted bands, while inviting up and coming women fronted acts to perform, in order to get new crowds to see them perform live. Now Girls Rule Networkings a space where professional women of various backgrounds and women artists come together to meet and talk about their work in the hopes of joining forces in new ventures and projects. La Marketa, the first-ever all-women artist's bazaar in Mexico, created so that artists can directly sell their merchandise to their fans, and keep 100% of their sales. La Marketa is an all ages, gender inclusive, and pet friendly event, featuring live performances by some of the artists. Elis Paprika also hosts the Now Girls Rule Podcast, a weekly show through Vive Latino's Señal VL channel, that features music by women artists or women fronted acts that Elis has met around the world while touring.

Riot Grrrl

Riot grrrl is an underground feminist hardcore punk movement that originally started in the early 1990s, in Washington, D.C., and the greater Pacific Northwest, noticeably in Olympia, Washington. It is often associated with third-wave feminism, which is sometimes seen as its starting point. It has also been described as a musical genre that came out of indie rock, with the punk scene serving as an inspiration for a musical movement in which women could express themselves in the same way men had been doing for the past several years.

Riot grrrl bands often address issues such as rape, domestic abuse, sexuality, racism, patriarchy, and female empowerment. Bands associated with the movement include Bikini Kill, Bratmobile, Heavens to Betsy, Excuse 17, Huggy Bear, Cake Like, Skinned Teen, Emily's Sassy Lime, Sleater-Kinney, and also queercore groups like Team Dresch. In addition to a music scene and genre, riot grrrl is a subculture involving a DIY ethic, zines, art, political action, and activism. Riot grrrls are known to hold meetings, start chapters, and support and organize women in music.

The use of the word "girl" was meant to indicate a time when girls are least influenced by societal pressures and therefore have the strongest self-esteem – childhood. The anger behind the movement was noted by the alternate spelling of the word as "grrrl", which sounds like a growl.

They partook in a new type of punk feminism that promoted the idea of do-it-yourself, exchanging manifestos and trading mixed tapes of favorite bands to get the word out. They were tired of women being erased from history or having their experiences misinterpreted and ignored by others. In, response to patriarchal violence, adultism, and heterocentrism, Riot grrrl engaged in negative emotional expressions and rhetoric similar to that of feminism and the punk aesthetic. The feminist argument that the personal is political was revisited in the image that Riot grrrl set forth, similarly to the culture of Punk that self-actualization is not to be found in external forces but rather through an individual's true self. By recognizing and reevaluating the institutional structures that affect individual experiences within social situations, an individual can gain the knowledge to better know herself and therefore know how to present herself to others so that they may know her accurately. Riot grrrl termed this movement to self-actualization, girl love – "girls learning to love themselves, and each other, against those forces that would otherwise see them destroyed or destroy themselves".

The accompanying slogan "every girl is a riot grrrl" reinforced the solidarity that women could find amongst themselves. This created an intimate aesthetic and sentimental politic well expressed in the production of zines (a shortened version of "fanzines"). Zines were handmade, crafted by individuals who wanted to connect directly with their readers, with simple items like scissors, glue, and tape. They called out injustices and challenged the norms that typically directed the expression of sexuality and domestic abuse, providing a space for women to exchange personal stories to which many others could relate. They challenged girls and women alike to stand up for themselves in a political atmosphere that actively sought to silence them. The shared personal stories were, at times, met with attitudes that reduced the communication to "it's all just girls in their bedrooms, sprawled out writing in their diaries, and then they'll send them to each other", while the choice to share in that way was an aesthetic one.

In the midst of this raising of awareness, riot grrrls had to address the generalizations that worked for them but that could not apply to women of color. Not all girls could be riot grrrl after all, for lack of privilege barred them from participating in such acts as writing "SLUT" across their stomach in an attempt to reclaim sexual agency. While this performance is an earnest one, racism had already labeled women of color as that term. As observed by Kearny, "the gender deviance displayed by riot grrrls is a privilege to which only middle-class white girls have access." Another aspect of this need for inclusive discourse arose in the movement's preference for concrete knowledge and a disregard for the abstract that would foster theoretical inquiry.

Festivals
Women's music festivals, which may also be called womyn's music festivals, have been held since the 1970s. Some women's music festivals are organized for lesbians. The first women's music festival was held in 1973 at Sacramento State University. In May 1974 the first National Woman's Music Festival was held in Champaign-Urbana, Illinois, founded by University of Illinois student Kristin Lems. It celebrated its 40th year in Middleton, Wisconsin, from 2–5 July 2015. As of 2015, it is a four-day event that includes concerts, workshops, comedy, theatre, films and writing events that "promote and affirm the creative talents and technical skills of women" from diverse, multicultural communities, including women with disabilities. While most attendees are women, men can attend. The Michigan Womyn's Music Festival was created in 1976, and became the largest festival in the United States.

An example of a festival that focuses on music is the Women in Music Festival held by the University of Rochester's Eastman School of Music. The festival began in 2005 as a celebration of the contributions of women to composition, performance, teaching, scholarship, and music administration. From its modest beginnings of Eastman students and faculty members performing music by women composers, the Festival has grown to include additional concerts and events throughout Rochester, NY and to host composers-in-residence, who have included Tania León (2007), Nancy Van de Vate (2008), Judith Lang Zaimont (2009), Emma Lou Diemer (2010), and Hilary Tann (2011). The festival has presented more than 291 different works by 158 composers.

Many other festivals have been created throughout the United States and Canada since the mid-1970s and vary in size from a few hundred to thousands of attendees. The Los Angeles Women's Music Festival began in 2007 with over 2500 attendees.  Events outside the US include the Sappho Lesbian Witch Camp, near Vancouver, British Columbia in Canada and the Sistajive Women's Music Festival in Australia. Some festivals are focused around the lesbian community, such as the Ohio Lesbian Festival, near Columbus Ohio, which was created in 1988; Christian Lesbians Out (CLOUT), which holds a gathering in early August in Washington, DC; The Old Lesbian Gathering, a festival in Minneapolis, Minnesota; and RadLesFes, an event held in the middle of November near Philadelphia, Pennsylvania. Feminist-oriented festivals include the Southern Womyn's Festival in Dade City, Florida; the Gulf Coast Womyn's Festival in Ovett, Missouri; Wiminfest in Albuquerque, New Mexico; Womongathering, the Festival of Womyn's Spirituality; the Michigan Womyn's Music Festival, near Hart, Michigan; and the Midwest Womyn's Festival in DeKalb, Illinois.

While women's music festivals are centered on music, they support many other facets of lesbian and feminist culture.  Some festivals are designed to provide a safe space for women's music and culture. Many festivals are held on college campuses or in remote rural locations, where attendees stay in campsites. Many festivals offer workshops on arts, crafts, fitness, and athletic events that women may not be able find in mainstream culture.  In her book Eden Built by Eves, Bonnie Morris describes how women's music festivals serve women throughout the stages of their lives. Since the festivals are organized by women, for women, daycare and childcare facilities are typically provided. Festivals often provide a safe space for coming of age rituals for young women, adult romance and commitment ceremonies, the expression of alternative perspectives on motherhood, and the expression of grief and loss.

Lilith Fair

Lilith Fair was a concert tour and travelling music festival that consisted solely of female solo artists and female-led bands. It was founded by Canadian musician Sarah McLachlan, Nettwerk Music Group's Dan Fraser and Terry McBride, and New York talent agent Marty Diamond. It took place during the summers of 1997 to 1999, and was revived in the summer of 2010.
McLachlan organized the festival after she became frustrated with concert promoters and radio stations that refused to feature two female musicians in a row. Bucking conventional industry wisdom, she booked a successful tour for herself and Paula Cole. At least one of their appearances together – in McLachlan's home town, on 14 September 1996 – went by the name "Lilith Fair" and included performances by McLachlan, Cole, Lisa Loeb and Michelle McAdorey, formerly of Crash Vegas.

The next year, McLachlan founded the Lilith Fair tour, taking Lilith from the medieval Jewish legend that Lilith was Adam's first wife. In 1997, Lilith Fair garnered a $16 million gross, making it the top-grossing of any touring festival. Among all concert tours for that year, it was the 16th highest grossing.
The festival received several pejorative nicknames, including "Breast-fest", "Girlapalooza", and "Clam Jam".

See also
 Lists of women in music
 Women in classical music
 Women in jazz
 Unsung: A History of Women in American Music 
 Women in art
 Women in dance
 Women in film
 Women in rock
 Women Who Rock: Making Scenes, Building Communities Oral History Archive
 Music and women's suffrage in the United States

 References 

Further reading

 Bowers, Jane and Tick, Judith (eds.). Women Making Music: The Western Art Tradition, 1150–1950 (Reprint Edition). Board of trustees of the University of Illinois, 1986. 
 Citron, Marcia J. Gender and the Musical Canon. CUP Archive, 1993.
 Dunbar, Julie C. Women, Music, Culture: An Introduction. Routledge, 2010. 
 Gates, Eugene. The Woman Composer Question: A Bibliography. The Kapralova Society, 1998–2020, available online at http://www.kapralova.org/BIBLIOGRAPHY.htm
 Goldin, C. and C. Rouse, 2000. "Orchestrating Impartiality: The Impact of 'Blind' Auditions on Female Musicians," American Economic Review, 90(4): 715–741.
 Pendle, Karin Anna. Women and Music: A History. Indiana University Press, 2001.
 Solie, Ruth A., ed., Musicology and Difference: Gender and Sexuality in Music Scholarship''. University of California Press, 1993.
 Millar, B. 2008 "selective hearing:gender bias in the music preferences young adults", Psychology of music, vol. 46, no.4, pp. 429–445
 Schmutz, V., & Faupel, A. (2010). Gender and Cultural Consecration in Popular Music. Social Forces, 89(2), 685–707. Retrieved from http://www.jstor.org/stable/40984552
 Barongan, C., & Hall, C. N. (1995). The influence of misogynous rap music on sexual aggression against women. Psychology of Women Quarterly, 19, 195–207.

 
Gendered occupations
Occupations in music
Music
Music
Music history
Music-related lists